= List of formations of the United States Army =

This is a list of historical formations of the United States Army. Units still in existence are in bold.

For specific eras:

- Formations of the United States Army during the Mexican Revolution
- Formations of the United States Army during World War I
- Formations of the United States Army during World War II
- Formations of the United States Army during the Vietnam War
- List of current formations of the United States Army

== Army groups ==
- 1st Army Group (World War II "phantom" formation)
- 6th Army Group
- 12th Army Group
- 15th Army Group

== Field armies ==
- First Allied Airborne Army
- **First United States Army**—U.S. Army Training, Readiness, and Mobilization command formation
- Second United States Army—United States Army Cyber Command
- **Third United States Army**—United States Army Central command formation
- Fourth United States Army
- **Fifth United States Army**—United States Army North command formation
- **Sixth United States Army**—United States Army South command formation
- **Seventh United States Army**—United States Army Europe command formation
- **Eighth United States Army**—United States Army Korea command formation
- **Ninth United States Army**—United States Army Africa command formation
- Tenth United States Army
- Fourteenth United States Army (World War II "phantom" formation)
- Fifteenth United States Army

== Army corps ==
Airborne, armored, and infantry are grouped separately. The numbering system for the airborne corps is a continuation of the infantry numbering system.

=== Airborne corps ===
- **XVIII Airborne Corps**

=== Armored corps ===
- I Armored Corps (reflagged as the Seventh Army)
- II Armored Corps (reflagged as XVIII Airborne Corps)
- III Armored Corps (reflagged as XIX Corps)
- IV Armored Corps (reflagged as XX Corps)

=== Army corps ===
- **I Corps**
- II Corps
- **III Corps**
- IV Corps
- **V Corps**
- VI Corps
- VII Corps
- VIII Corps
- IX Corps

- X Corps
- XI Corps
- XII Corps
- XIII Corps
- XIV Corps
- XV Corps
- XVI Corps
- XVII Corps

- XIX Corps
- XX Corps
- XXI Corps
- XXII Corps
- XXIII Corps
- XXIV Corps
- XXXVI Corps
- XXXVII Corps

== Army divisions ==
=== Air assault divisions ===
- 11th Air Assault Division (Test) (1963–1965)

=== Airborne divisions ===
- 6th Airborne Division (phantom World War II division)
- 9th Airborne Division (phantom World War II division)
- **11th Airborne Division** "Angels"
- 13th Airborne Division "Lucky Thirteenth"
- 15th Airborne Division - planned for ("placed on rolls") but never formed during the Second World War
- 17th Airborne Division "Golden Talons"
- 18th Airborne Division (phantom World War II division)
- 21st Airborne Division (phantom World War II division)
- 80th Airborne Division (1946–52)
- **82nd Airborne Division** "All American"
- 84th Airborne Division (1946–52)
- 100th Airborne Division (1946–52)
- **101st Airborne Division** "Screaming Eagles"
- 108th Airborne Division (1946–52), Later Division was Army Reserve Division, serving as in Infantry and later Training missions
- 135th Airborne Division (see United States Army deception formations of World War II)

=== Armored divisions ===
- **1st Armored Division** "Old Ironsides"
- 2nd Armored Division "Hell On Wheels"
- 3rd Armored Division "Spearhead Division"
- 4th Armored Division "Breakthrough Division"
- 5th Armored Division "Victory"
- 6th Armored Division "Super Sixth", "Bulgebusters"
- 7th Armored Division "Lucky Seventh"
- 8th Armored Division "Showhorse"
- 9th Armored Division "The Phantom Division"
- 10th Armored Division "Tiger Division"
- 11th Armored Division "Thunderbolt Division"
- 12th Armored Division "Hellcat Division"
- 13th Armored Division
- 14th Armored Division
- 15th Armored Division (phantom World War II division)
- 16th Armored Division
- 18th Armored Division (unorganized World War II division)
- 19th Armored Division (unorganized World War II division)
- 20th Armored Division
- 21st Armored Division (unorganized World War II division)
- 22nd Armored Division (unorganized World War II division)
- 25th Armored Division (phantom World War II division)
- 27th Armored Division
- 30th Armored Division
- 39th Armored Division (see United States Army deception formations of World War II) (possible post war Armored Brigade, not division)
- 40th Armored Division
- 48th Armored Division (Georgia Army National Guard to 1967)
- 49th Armored Division "Lone Star" TX ARNG (1946–68, 1973–2004)
- 50th Armored Division "Jersey Blues" NJ ARNG (up to early 1990s)

=== Cavalry divisions ===
- Cavalry Division—authorized as the 4th Regular Army division in 1913; never officially numerically designated.
- **1st Cavalry Division**
- 2nd Cavalry Division
- 3rd Cavalry Division
- 15th Cavalry Division
- 21st Cavalry Division
- 22nd Cavalry Division
- 23rd Cavalry Division
- 24th Cavalry Division
- 61st Cavalry Division
- 62nd Cavalry Division
- 63rd Cavalry Division
- 64th Cavalry Division
- 65th Cavalry Division
- 66th Cavalry Division

=== Infantry divisions ===
- **1st Infantry Division** "The Big Red One"
- **2nd Infantry Division** "Indian Head Division"
- **3rd Infantry Division** "Rock of the Marne"
- **4th Infantry Division** "Ivy Division", "Iron Horse"
- 5th Infantry Division "Red Diamond"
- 6th Infantry Division "Red Star"
- **7th Infantry Division** "Bayonet Division"
- 8th Infantry Division "Pathfinders", "Golden Arrow"
- 9th Infantry Division "Octfoil", "Old Reliables"
- 10th Division (World War I)
- 10th Mountain Infantry Division (1943–1957)
- 11th Division (World War I)
- 12th Division (World War I)
- 12th Infantry Division "Philippine division"
- 13th Division "Lucky 13 Division" (World War I)
- 14th Division (World War I)
- 14th Infantry Division (phantom World War II division)
- 15th Division (World War I)
- 16th Division (World War I)
- 17th Division (World War I)
- 18th Division (World War I)
- 19th Division "Moon & Star"
- 19th Infantry Division (phantom World War II division)
- 20th Division (World War I)
- 22nd Infantry Division (phantom World War II division)
- 23rd Infantry Division "Americal Division"
- 24th Infantry Division "Victory Division"
- **25th Infantry Division** "Tropic Lightning"
- 26th Infantry Division "Yankee Division"
- 27th Infantry Division "New York Division"
- **28th Infantry Division** "Keystone Division"
- **29th Infantry Division** "The Blue and Gray"
- 30th Infantry Division "Old Hickory"
- 31st Infantry Division "Dixie Division"
- 32nd Infantry Division "Red Arrow"
- 33rd Infantry Division "Prairie Division"
- **34th Infantry Division** "Red Bull Division"
- **35th Infantry Division** "Santa Fe Division"
- **36th Infantry Division** "Texas Division"
- 37th Infantry Division "Buckeye Division"
- **38th Infantry Division** "Cyclone Division"
- 39th Infantry Division "Delta Division"
- **40th Infantry Division** "Sunburst Division"
- 41st Infantry Division "Sunset Division"
- **42nd Infantry Division** "Rainbow Division"
- 43rd Infantry Division "Red Wing Division"
- 44th Infantry Division
- 45th Infantry Division "Thunderbird Division"
- 46th Infantry Division (United States) (phantom World War II division, postwar National Guard formation)
- 47th Infantry Division (Post-war National Guard Division nicknamed "Viking")
- 48th Infantry Division (United States) (phantom World War II division, postwar National Guard formation)
- 49th Infantry Division (Post-war National Guard Division nicknamed "49'ers")
- 50th Infantry Division (phantom World War II division)
- 51st Infantry Division (Post-war National Guard Division)
- 52nd Infantry Division
- 55th Infantry Division (phantom World War II division)
- 59th Infantry Division (phantom World War II division)
- 61st Infantry Division (see Divisions of the United States Army, unorganized World War II division)
- 62nd Infantry Division (see Divisions of the United States Army, unorganized World War II division)
- 63rd Infantry Division
- 65th Infantry Division
- 66th Infantry Division
- an infantry division with the number 67 was never organized during World War II (see Divisions of the United States Army)
- 68th Infantry Division - never organized during World War II (see Divisions of the United States Army)
- 69th Infantry Division
- 70th Infantry Division "Trailblazers"
- 71st Infantry Division "Red Circle"
- an infantry division with the number 72 was never organized during World War II (see Divisions of the United States Army)
- an infantry division with the number 73 was never organized during World War II (see Divisions of the United States Army)
- an infantry division with the number 74 was never organized during World War II (see Divisions of the United States Army)
- 75th Infantry Division
- 76th Infantry Division "Liberty Bell Division"
- 77th Infantry Division "Metropolitan Division" also "Statue of Liberty Division"
- 78th Infantry Division "Lightning Division"
- 79th Infantry Division "Liberty Division"
- 80th Infantry Division "Blue Ridge Division"
- 81st Infantry Division "Wildcat Division"
- 82nd Infantry Division "All American Division" (Later Airborne Division with same number)
- 83rd Infantry Division "Thunderbolt Division"
- 84th Infantry Division "Railsplitters"
- 85th Infantry Division "Custer Division"
- 86th Infantry Division "Blackhawk Division"
- 87th Infantry Division "Golden Acorn"
- 88th Infantry Division "Blue Devils"
- 89th Infantry Division "Rolling W Division"
- 90th Infantry Division "Tough Ombres"
- 91st Infantry Division "Wild West"
- 92nd Infantry Division "Buffalo Division"
- 93rd Infantry Division "Blue Helmets"
- 94th Infantry Division "Neuf-Cats"
- 95th Infantry Division "Ironman Division" (Also "Victory Division", and "Iron Men of Metz Division")
- 96th Infantry Division "Deadeye Division"
- 97th Infantry Division "Trident Division"
- 98th Infantry Division "Iroquois"
- 99th Infantry Division "Checkerboard Division"
- 100th Infantry Division "Century"
- 101st Division (Later Airborne Division with same number)
- 102nd Infantry Division "Ozark Division"
- 103rd Infantry Division "Cactus Division"
- 104th Infantry Division "Timberwolf"
- intended as a Black formation, an infantry division with the number 105 was never organized during World War II
- 106th Infantry Division "Golden Lion Division"
- an infantry division with the number 107 was never organized during World War II
- 108th Infantry Division {phantom World War II Division}
- 108th Infantry Division "Golden Griffons" (Formerly Airborne Division of same number)
- 109th Infantry Division (phantom World War II division)
- 112th Infantry Division (phantom World War II division)
- 119th Infantry Division (phantom World War II division)
- 125th Infantry Division (phantom World War II division)
- 130th Infantry Division (phantom World War II division)
- 141st Infantry Division (phantom World War II division)
- 157th Infantry Division (phantom World War II division)
- Americal Division (see 23rd Infantry Division)
- Hawaiian Division (see also: 24th Infantry Division; 25th Infantry Division)
- Maneuver Division (1911)
- Panama Canal Division (inactivated 1932)
- Philippine Division (see 12th Infantry Division)

=== Light divisions ===
- 10th Light Division (Alpine)
- 71st Light Division (Truck)
- 89th Light Division (Pack)

=== Mountain divisions ===
- **10th Mountain Division**

=== Reserve training divisions ===
- 75th Division
- 78th Division "Lightning Division"
- 80th Division "Blue Ridge Division"
- 84th Division "Lincoln County Division"
- 85th Division "Custer Division"
- 87th Division "Golden Acorn Division"
- 91st Division "Wild West Division"
- **95th Division** "Victory Division"
- 98th Division "Iroquois Division"
- **100th Division** "Century Division"
- 104th Division "Timberwolf Division"
- 108th Division "Golden Griffons"
