= List of formations of the United States Army during World War II =

This is a list of formations of the United States Army during the World War II. Many of these formations still exist today, though many by different designations. Included are formations that were placed on rolls, but never organized, as well as "phantom" formations used in the Allied Operation Quicksilver deception of 1944—these are marked accordingly.

== Army groups ==
- 1st Army Group ("phantom" formation)
- 6th Army Group
- 12th Army Group
- 15th Army Group

== Field armies ==
- First Allied Airborne Army
- First United States Army
- Second United States Army
- Third United States Army
- Fourth United States Army
- Fifth United States Army
- Sixth United States Army
- Seventh United States Army
- Eighth United States Army
- Ninth United States Army
- Tenth United States Army
- Fourteenth United States Army ("phantom" formation)
- Fifteenth United States Army

== Corps ==
- I Corps
- I Armored Corps
- II Corps
- III Corps
- IV Corps
- V Corps
- VI Corps
- VII Corps
- VIII Corps
- IX Corps
- X Corps
- XI Corps
- XII Corps
- XIII Corps
- XIV Corps
- XV Corps
- XVI Corps
- XVIII Airborne Corps
- XIX Corps
- XX Corps
- XXI Corps
- XXII Corps
- XXIII Corps
- XXIV Corps
- XXXVI Corps

In addition, the presence of three additional "corps" were advertised to German and Japanese espionage efforts: the XXXIII, XXXV Airborne, and XXXVII Corps. The presence of these non-existent headquarters were portrayed by radio deception, and other efforts like creating unit patches. See United States Army deception formations of World War II.

== Divisions ==
Airborne, armored, cavalry, infantry, and mountain divisions are grouped separately. The numbering system for the airborne and mountain divisions are a continuation of the infantry numbering system—"phantom" formations are an exception to that numbering system.

=== Airborne divisions ===
- 6th Airborne Division ("phantom" formation)
- 9th Airborne Division ("phantom" formation)
- 11th Airborne Division
- 13th Airborne Division
- 15th Airborne Division (never organized)
- 17th Airborne Division
- 18th Airborne Division ("phantom" formation)
- 21st Airborne Division ("phantom" formation)
- 82nd Airborne Division
- 101st Airborne Division
- 135th Airborne Division ("phantom" formation)

=== Armored divisions ===
- 1st Armored Division
- 2nd Armored Division
- 3rd Armored Division
- 4th Armored Division
- 5th Armored Division
- 6th Armored Division
- 7th Armored Division
- 8th Armored Division
- 9th Armored Division
- 10th Armored Division
- 11th Armored Division
- 12th Armored Division
- 13th Armored Division
- 14th Armored Division
- 15th Armored Division ("phantom" formation)
- 16th Armored Division
- 18th Armored Division (constituted but never activated)
- 19th Armored Division (constituted but never activated)
- 20th Armored Division
- 21st Armored Division (constituted but never activated)
- 22nd Armored Division (constituted but never activated)
- 25th Armored Division ("phantom" deception formation)
- 39th Armored Division ("phantom" formation)

=== Cavalry divisions ===
- 1st Cavalry Division
- 2nd Cavalry Division

=== Infantry divisions ===
- 1st Infantry Division
- 2nd Infantry Division
- 3rd Infantry Division
- 4th Infantry Division
- 5th Infantry Division
- 6th Infantry Division
- 7th Infantry Division
- 8th Infantry Division
- 9th Infantry Division
- 11th Infantry Division ("phantom" formation)
- 14th Infantry Division ("phantom" formation)
- 17th Infantry Division ("phantom" formation)
- 22nd Infantry Division ("phantom" formation)
- 24th Infantry Division
- 25th Infantry Division
- 26th Infantry Division
- 27th Infantry Division
- 28th Infantry Division
- 29th Infantry Division
- 30th Infantry Division
- 31st Infantry Division
- 32nd Infantry Division
- 33rd Infantry Division
- 34th Infantry Division
- 35th Infantry Division
- 36th Infantry Division
- 37th Infantry Division
- 38th Infantry Division
- 40th Infantry Division
- 41st Infantry Division
- 42nd Infantry Division
- 43rd Infantry Division
- 44th Infantry Division
- 45th Infantry Division
- 46th Infantry Division ("phantom" formation)
- 48th Infantry Division ("phantom" formation)
- 50th Infantry Division ("phantom" formation)
- 55th Infantry Division ("phantom" formation)
- 59th Infantry Division ("phantom" formation)
- 61st Infantry Division (constituted but never activated)
- 62nd Infantry Division (constituted but never activated)
- 63rd Infantry Division
- 65th Infantry Division
- 66th Infantry Division
- 67th Infantry Division (constituted but never activated)
- 68th Infantry Division (constituted but never activated)
- 69th Infantry Division
- 70th Infantry Division
- 71st Infantry Division
- 72nd Infantry Division (constituted but never activated)
- 73rd Infantry Division (constituted but never activated)
- 74th Infantry Division (constituted but never activated)
- 75th Infantry Division
- 76th Infantry Division
- 77th Infantry Division
- 78th Infantry Division
- 79th Infantry Division
- 80th Infantry Division
- 81st Infantry Division
- 83rd Infantry Division
- 84th Infantry Division
- 85th Infantry Division
- 86th Infantry Division
- 87th Infantry Division
- 88th Infantry Division
- 89th Infantry Division
- 90th Infantry Division
- 91st Infantry Division
- 92nd Infantry Division
- 93rd Infantry Division
- 94th Infantry Division
- 95th Infantry Division
- 96th Infantry Division
- 97th Infantry Division
- 98th Infantry Division
- 99th Infantry Division
- 100th Infantry Division
- 102nd Infantry Division
- 103rd Infantry Division
- 104th Infantry Division
- 105th Infantry Division (constituted but never activated)
- 106th Infantry Division
- 107th Infantry Division (constituted but never activated)
- 108th Infantry Division ("phantom" formation - activated following the war as the 108th Airborne Division)
- 109th Infantry Division ("phantom" formation)
- 112th Infantry Division ("phantom" formation)
- 119th Infantry Division ("phantom" formation)
- 125th Infantry Division ("phantom" formation)
- 130th Infantry Division ("phantom" formation)
- 141st Infantry Division ("phantom" formation)
- 157th Infantry Division ("phantom" formation)
- Americal Division
- Philippine Division

=== Mountain divisions ===
- 10th Mountain Division

== See also ==
- Military history of the United States during World War II
- United States in World War II (disambiguation)
