= Divisional insignia of the United States Army =

Cloth emblems worn on the shoulders of US Army uniforms

Shoulder sleeve insignia (SSI) are cloth emblems worn on the shoulders of US Army uniforms to identify the primary headquarters to which a soldier is assigned. The SSI of some army divisions have become known in popular culture.

== Airborne/infantry ==
Note: several insignia are of World War II formations.

Note: US infantry divisions were not formed under the following numbers: 53, 54, 56, 57, 58, 60, 64, 67, 68.

1st Infantry Division
"Big Red One"

2nd Infantry Division
"Indianhead"

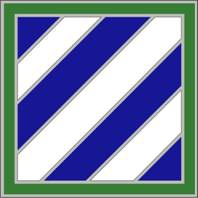
3rd Infantry Division
"Marne Division"

4th Infantry Division
"Ivy Division"

5th Infantry Division
"Red Diamond"

6th Infantry Division
"Sightseeing Sixth"

6th Airborne Division
Operation Vendetta "phantom" unit

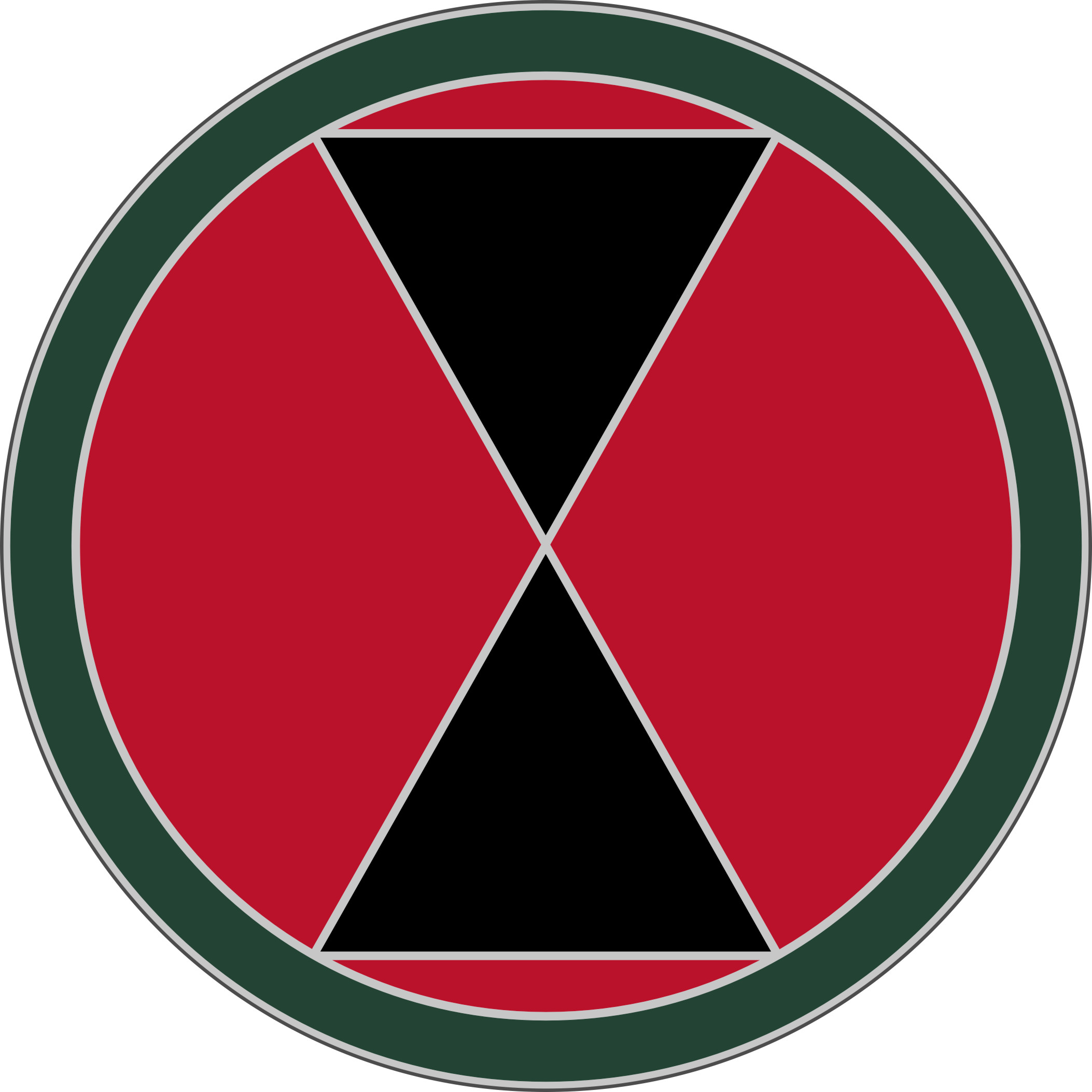
7th Infantry Division
"Bayonet"

8th Infantry Division
"Pathfinder"

9th Infantry Division
"Old Reliables"

9th Airborne Division
Fourteenth Army "phantom" unit

10th Division
(Regular Army/National Guard unit of 1918–19)

10th Mountain Division
"Climb to Glory" Division Formerly "10th Light Division (Alpine)" [World War II]
10th Infantry Division
June 1948 - June 1958

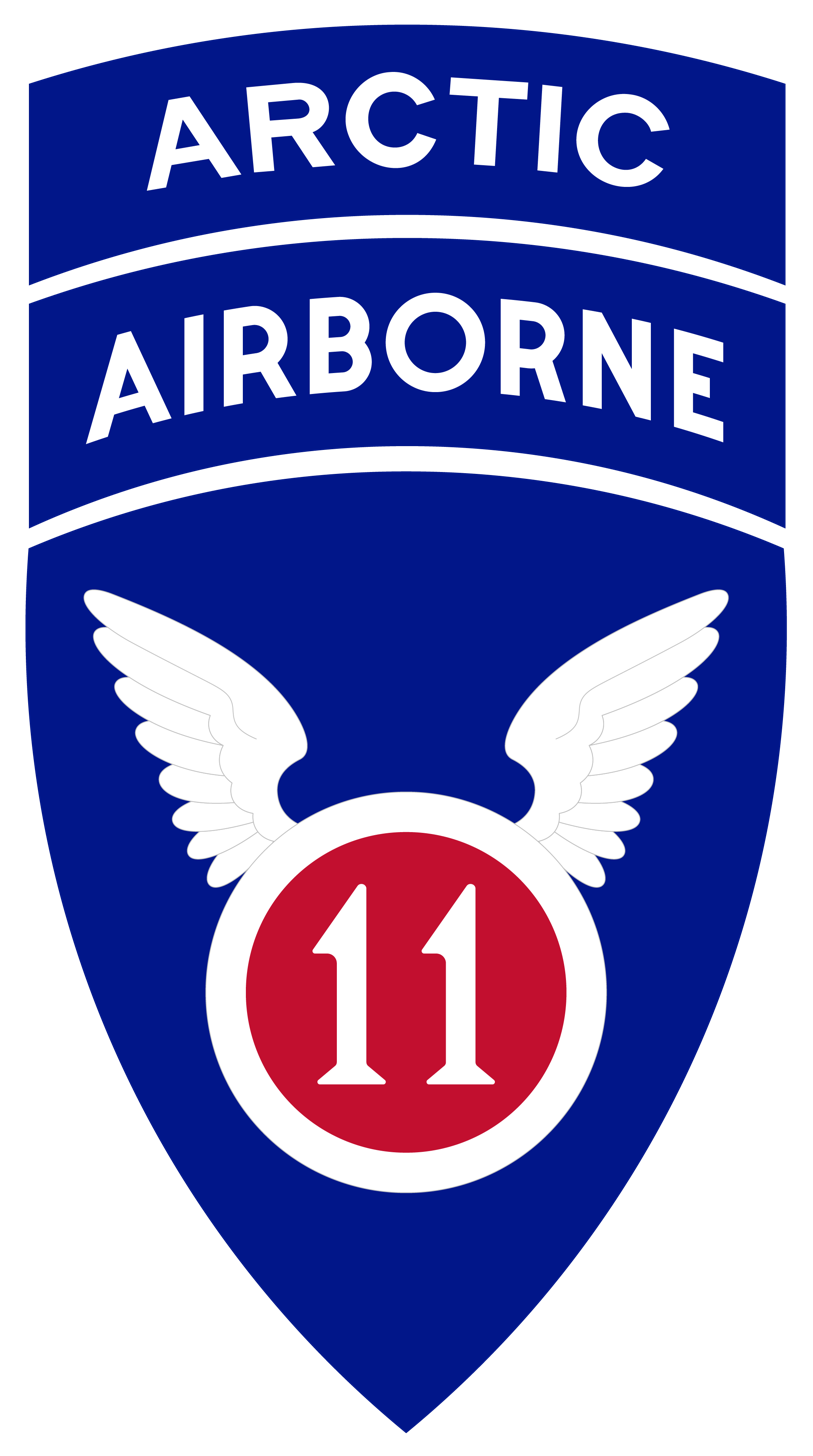
11th Airborne Division
"Angels"

11th Infantry Division
"Lafayette Div"
(Regular Army/National Guard 1918–19; distinct from National Guard 11th Division)

11th Infantry Division
Fourteenth Army "phantom" unit

12th Infantry Division
1917–19
"Plymouth Division"

12th Infantry Division
1921-1945
"Philippine Division"

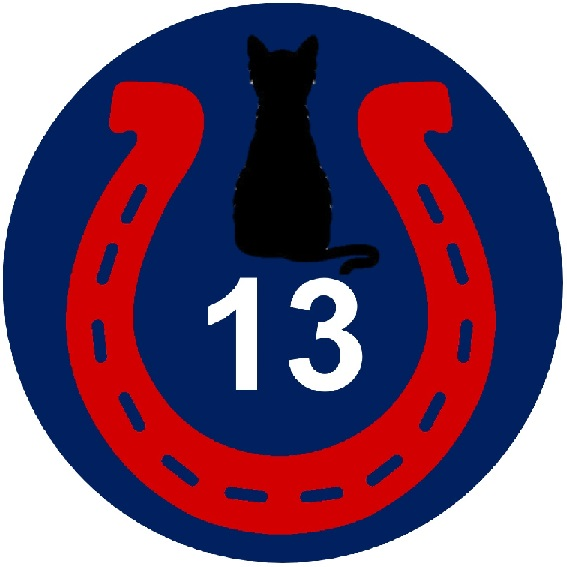
13th Division
1918-19
"Lucky 13th"

13th Airborne Division 1943-1946 "Unicorn" Division

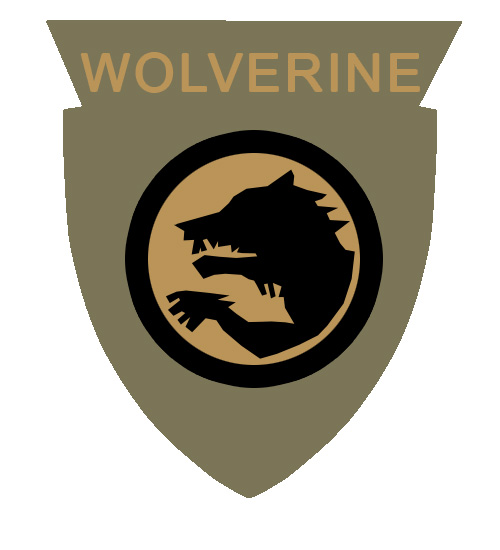
14th Infantry Division 1918-1919 "Wolverine" Division

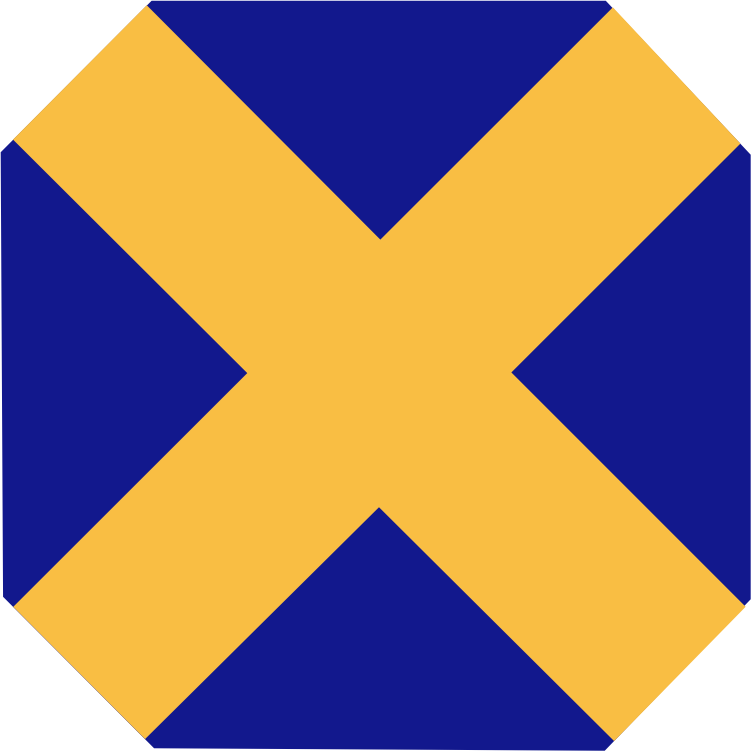
14th Division
(National Guard WWI—distinct from Regular Army 14th Division)

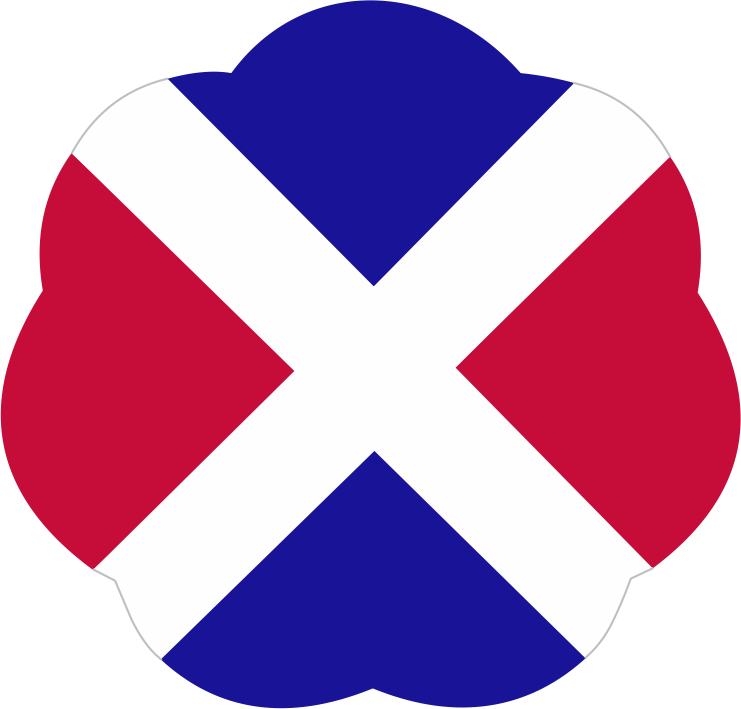
17th Infantry Division
Fourteenth Army "phantom" unit

17th Airborne Division
"Golden Talons" Division

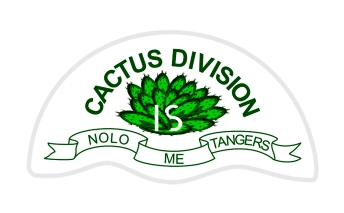
18th Division
(Regular army/National Guard WWI—distinct from National Guard 18th Division)

18th Airborne Division
"phantom" unit

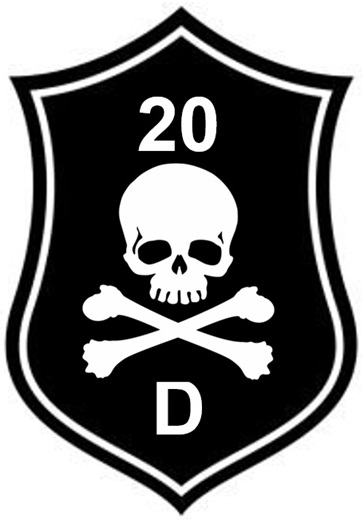
20th Division
(Regular army)
1918–1919

21st Airborne Division
Fourteenth Army "phantom" unit

22nd Infantry Division
"phantom" unit (Used in Middle East)

23rd Infantry Division
"Americal"

24th Infantry Division
"Victory Division"

25th Infantry Division
"Tropic Lightning"

26th Infantry Division
"Yankee"

27th Infantry Division
"New York" Division

28th Infantry Division
"Keystone"

29th Infantry Division
"Blue and Gray"

30th Infantry Division
"Old Hickory" Division

31st Infantry Division
"Dixie Division"

32nd Infantry Division
"Red Arrow"

33rd Infantry Division
"Prairie"

34th Infantry Division
"Red Bull"

35th Infantry Division
"Santa Fe"

36th Infantry Division
"Arrowhead"

37th Infantry Division
"Buckeye"

38th Infantry Division
"Cyclone"

39th Infantry Division
"Delta Division"

40th Infantry Division
"Sunshine Division"

41st Infantry Division
"Jungleers" Division

42nd Infantry Division
"Rainbow"

43rd Infantry Division
"Winged Victory" Division

44th Infantry Division
"Prepared In All Things Division"

45th Infantry Division
1924–1939

45th Infantry Division
"Thunderbird"
1939–1953

46th Infantry Division
Operation Wadham "phantom" unit

46th Infantry Division
"Iron Fist" Division
1947–1968

47th Infantry Division
"Viking Division"

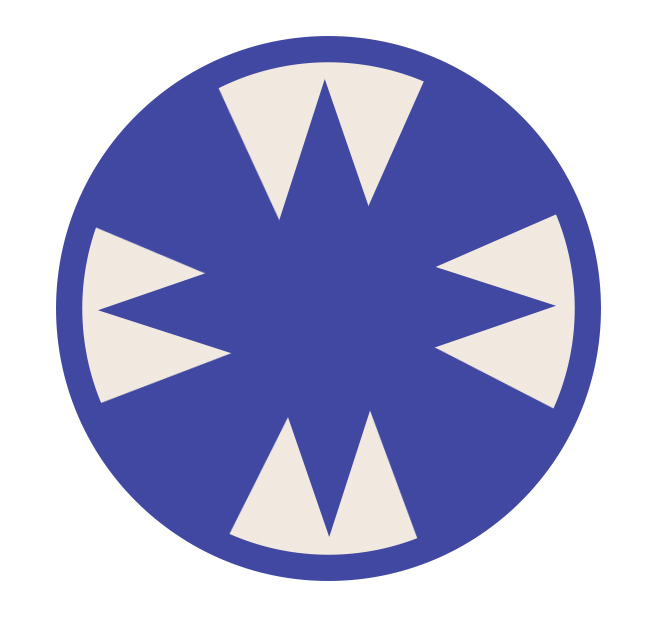
48th Infantry Division Operation Quicksilver (US Phantom Division WW2)

48th Infantry Division

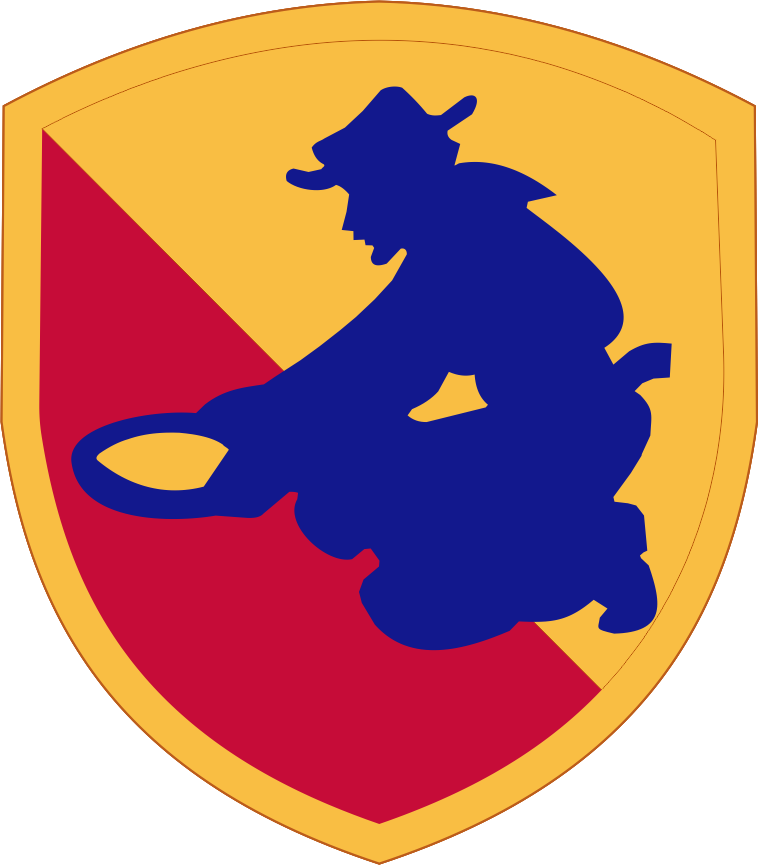
49th Infantry Division
"Argonauts"

50th Infantry Division
"phantom" unit

51st Infantry Division

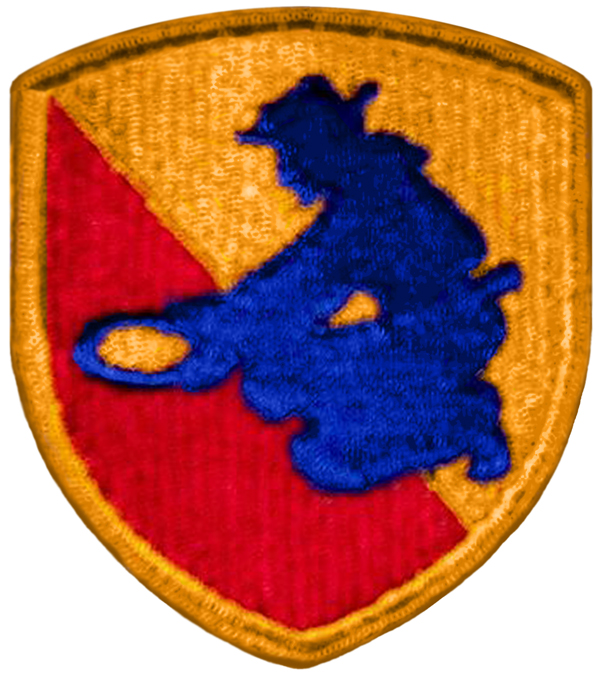
52nd Infantry Division
(52nd SSI changed to 49th Division in 1947)

55th Infantry Division
Fourth British Army "phantom" unit

59th Infantry Division
"Rattlesnake"
Fourteenth Army "phantom" unit

63rd Infantry Division
"Blood and Fire"

65th Infantry Division
"Battle-Axe" Division

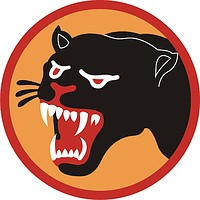
66th Infantry Division

69th Infantry Division
"Fighting Sixty-Ninth" Division

70th Infantry Division
"Trailblazers"

71st Infantry Division
"The Red Circle" Division

75th Infantry Division
"Make Ready" Division

76th Infantry Division
"Onway/Liberty Bell" Division

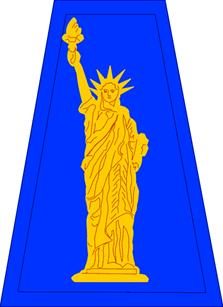
77th Infantry Division
"Statue of Liberty"

78th Infantry Division
"Lightning"

79th Infantry Division
"Cross of Lorraine" Division

80th Division
"Blue Ridge" Division

81st Infantry Division
"Wildcat"

82nd Airborne Division
"All American"

83rd Infantry Division
"Thunderbolt"

84th Infantry Division
"Railsplitters"

85th Infantry Division
"Custer"

86th Infantry Division
"Blackhawk Division"

87th Infantry Division
"Golden Acorn"

88th Infantry Division
"Fighting Blue Devils/Clover Leaf Division"

89th Infantry Division
"Rolling W" Division

90th Infantry Division
"Tough 'ombres"

91st Infantry Division
"Wild West Division"

92nd Infantry Division
"Buffalo Soldiers" Division

93d Infantry Division
"Blue Helmets" Division

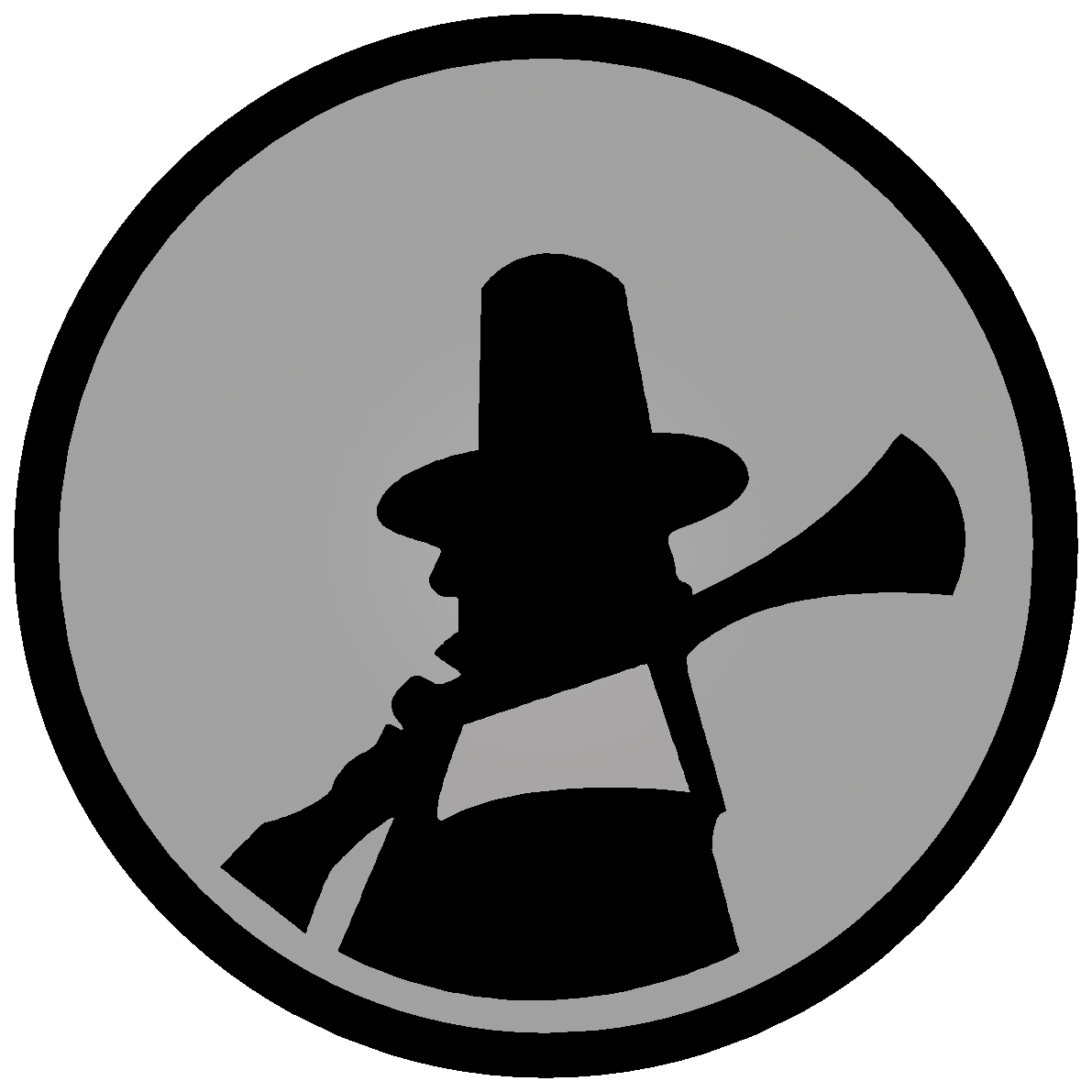
94th Infantry Division
"Neuf Cats" Division
1923–1942; 1956–1967

94th Infantry Division
"Neuf Cats" Division
1942–1956

95th Infantry Division
"Iron Men of Metz"

96th Infantry Division
"The Deadeye Division"

97th Infantry Division
"Trident" Division

98th Infantry Division
"Iroquois"

99th Infantry Division
"Checkerboard Division"

100th Division
"Century"

101st Airborne Division
"Screaming Eagles"

102nd Infantry Division
"Ozark"

103rd Infantry Division
"Cactus Division"

104th Infantry Division
"Timberwolf" Division

106th Infantry Division
"Golden Lions" Division

108th Division
"Golden Griffins" Division

119th Infantry Division
Operation Wedlock "phantom" unit

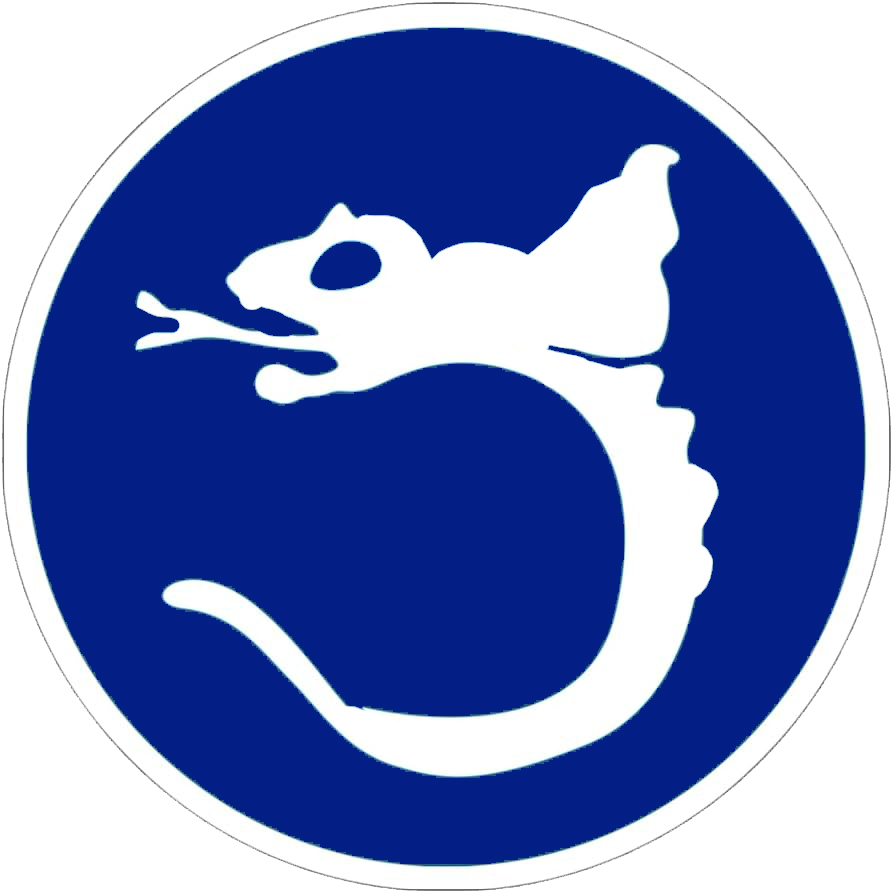
130th Infantry Division (US Phantom Division WW2)

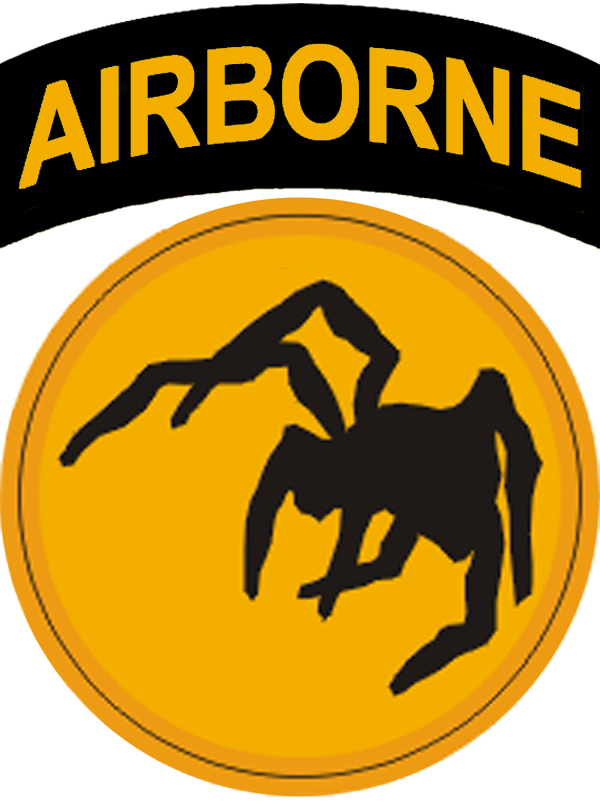
135th Airborne Division
"phantom" unit

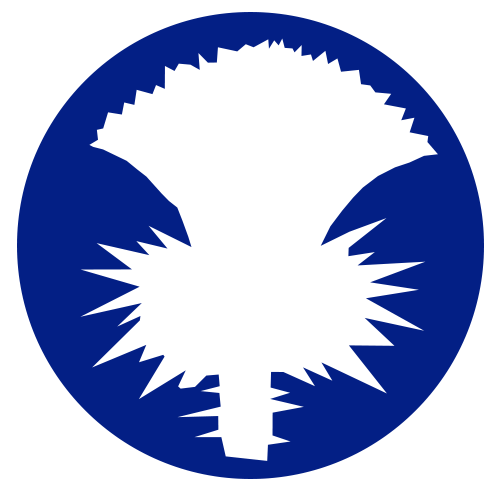
141st Infantry Division (US Phantom Unit WW2)

== Unnumbered ==
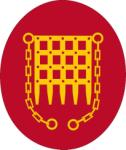
Panama Canal Division
1921–1932

Hawaiian Division 1921-1941

== Cavalry ==
1st Cavalry Division
"The First Team"

2nd Cavalry Division

3rd Cavalry Division

21st Cavalry Division

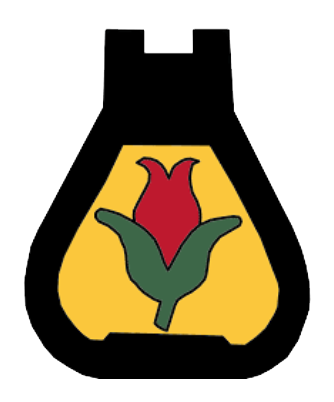
24th Cavalry Division

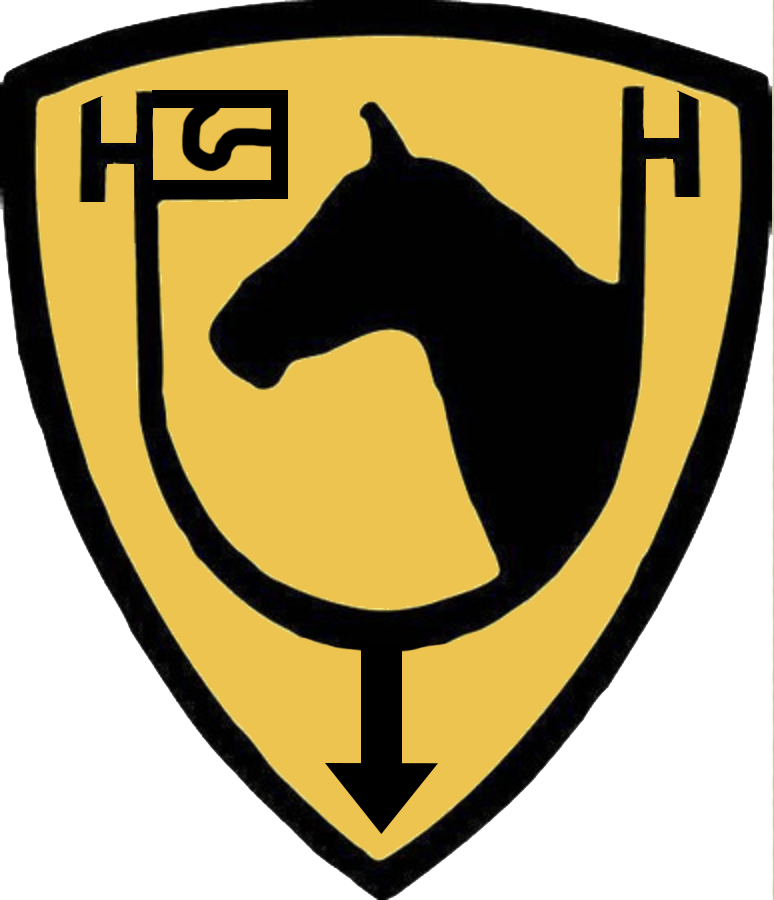
61st Cavalry Division

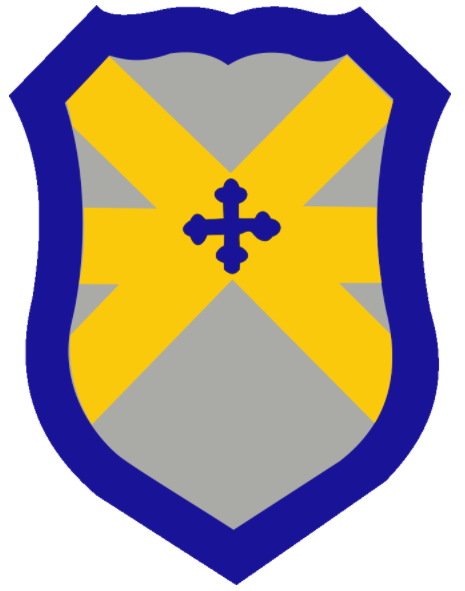
62nd Cavalry Division

63rd Cavalry Division

65th Cavalry Division

66th Cavalry Division

== Armored ==
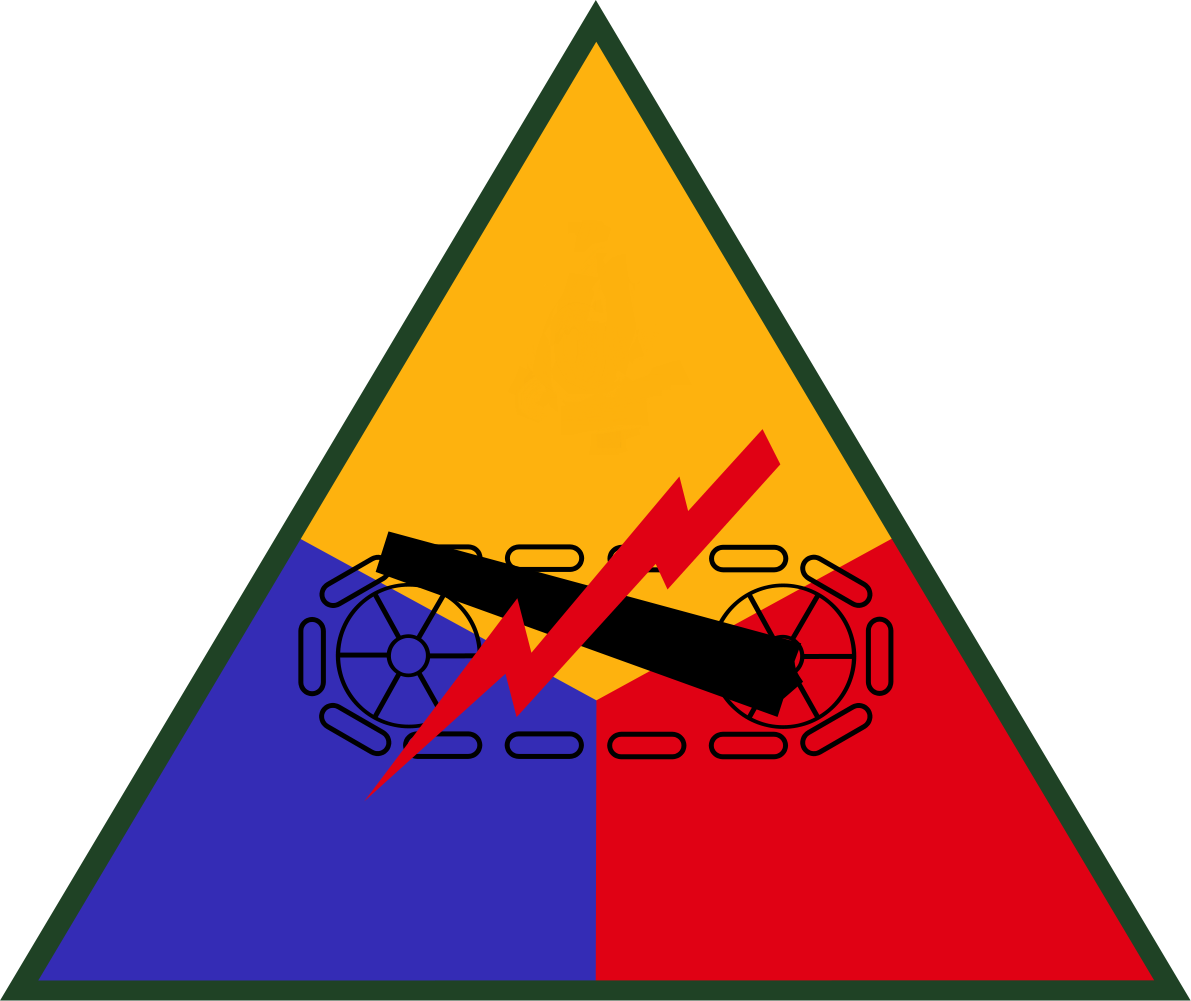
Armored Forces

1st Armored Division
"Old Ironsides"
March 1932 – April 1946
March 1951 – today

2nd Armored Division
"Hell On Wheels"
July 1940 – Dec 1995

3rd Armored Division "Spearhead'
April 1941 – Nov 1945
July 1947 – Oct 1992

4th Armored Division
"Name Enough"
April 1941 – 1971

5th Armored Division "Victory"
Oct 1941 – Oct 1945

6th Armored Division "Super Sixth"
Feb 1942 – Sept 1945

7th Armored Division "Lucky Seventh"
March 1942 – Oct 1945

8th Armored Division
"Iron Snake"
April 1942 – Nov 1945

9th Armored Division "Phantom"
July 1942 – Oct 1945

10th Armored Division "Tiger"
July 1942 – Oct 1945

11th Armored Division "Thunderbolt"
Aug 1942 – Aug 1945

12th Armored Division "Hellcat Division"
Sept 1942 – Dec 1945

13th Armored Division "Black Cats"
Oct 1942 – Nov 1945

14th Armored Division "Liberators"
Nov 1942 – Sept 1945

15th Armored Division
World War II "phantom" unit
see Operation Fortitude

16th Armored Division "Lightning Power"
July 1943 – Oct 1945

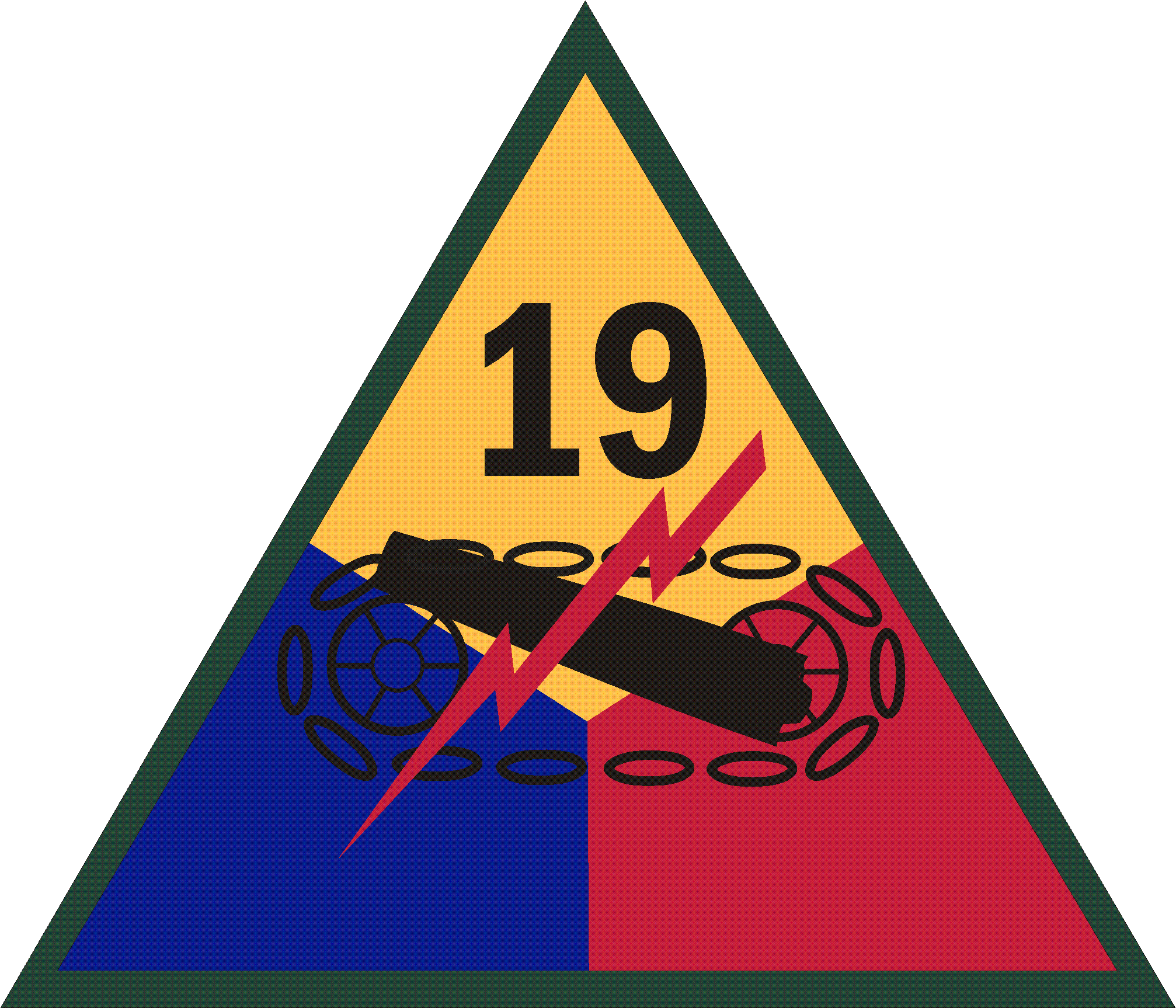
19th Armored Division

20th Armored Division "Armoraiders"
March 1943 – April 1946

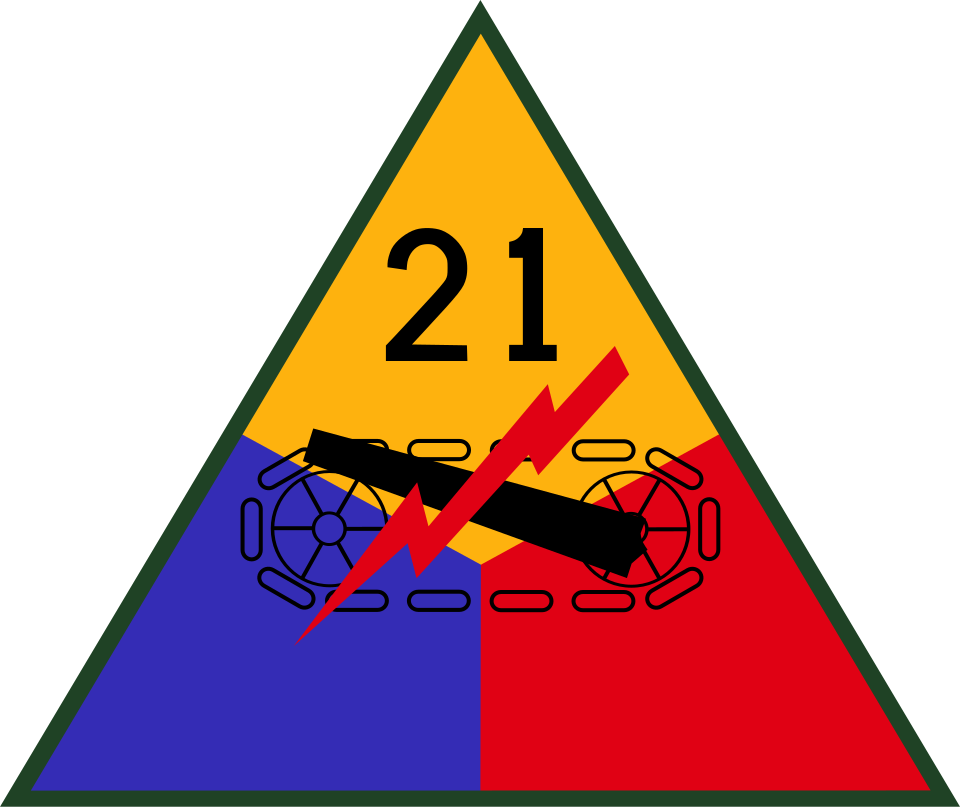
21st Armored Division (1946-1952) USAR Detroit, MI

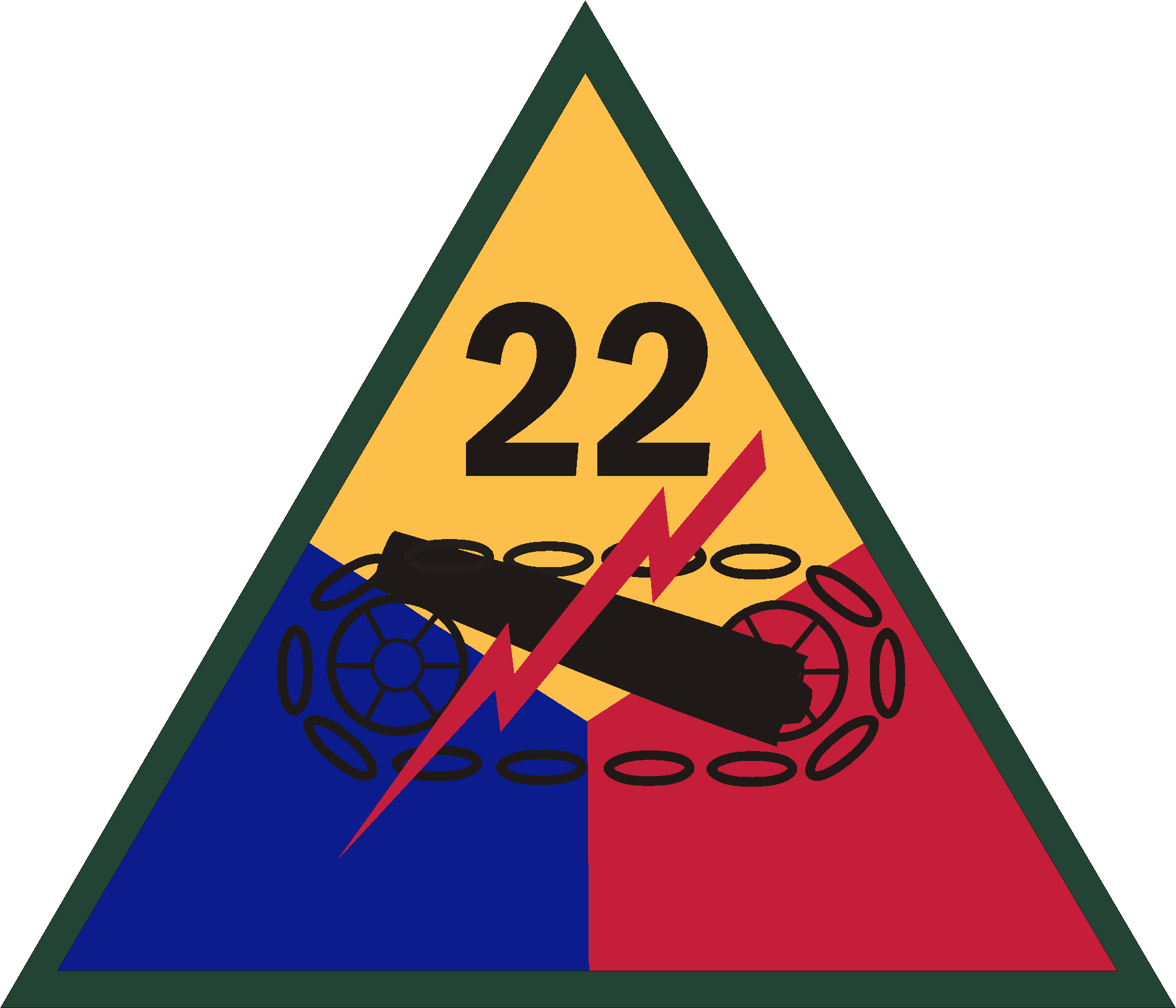
22nd Armored Division (1943-1947) Reflagged as 75th Infantry in 1952 Is now 75th Innovation Command

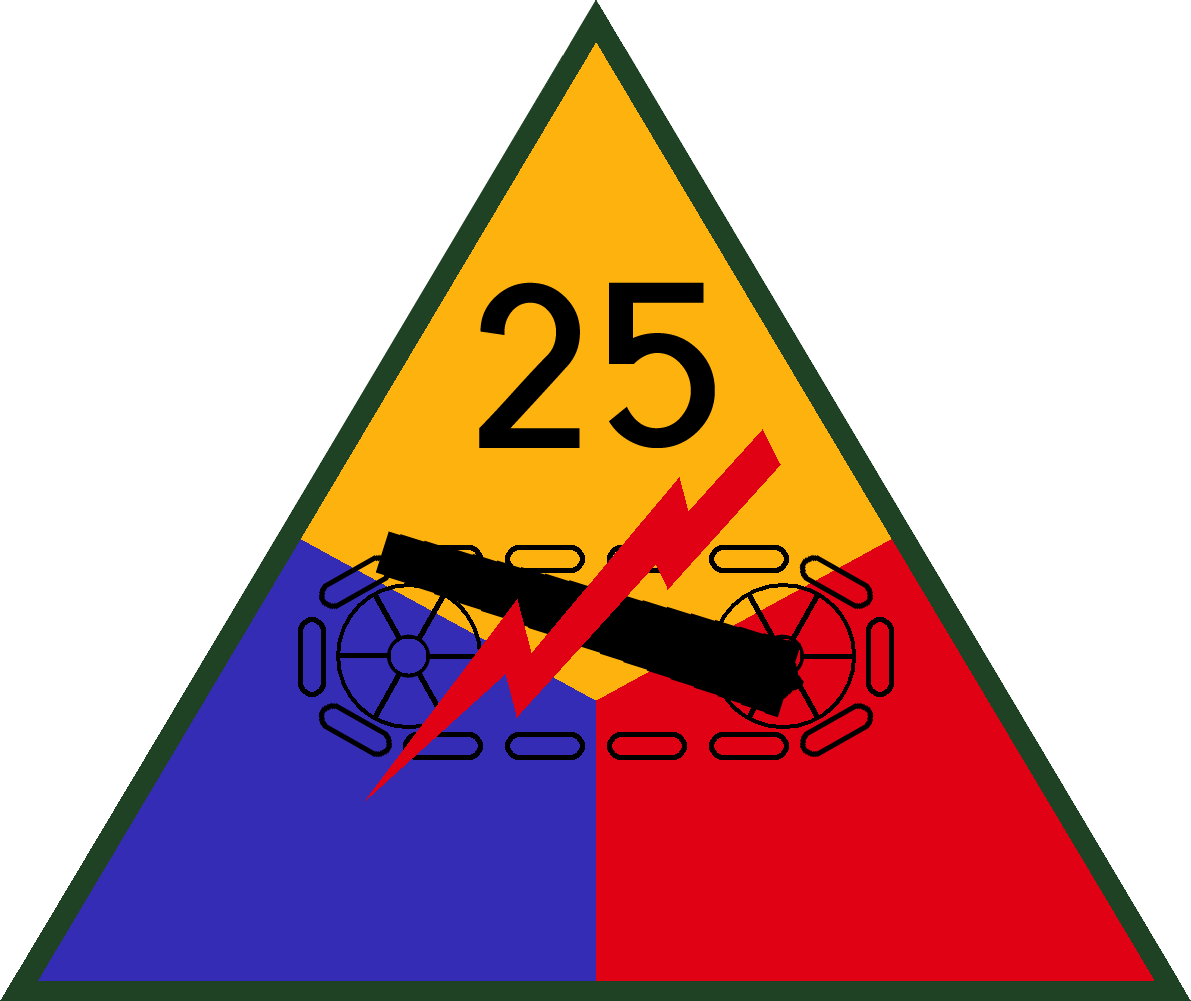
25th Armored Division
World War II "phantom" unit
of the US 14th Army

27th Armored Division "Empire Division"
1955–1967

30th Armored Division "Volunteers"
1954 – Dec 1973
Tennessee National Guard

39th Armored Division
World War II "phantom" unit
see Operation Fortitude

40th Armored Division "Grizzly Division"
July 1954 – 1968
California National Guard

48th Armored Division "Hurricane Division"
Florida National Guard

49th Armored Division "Lone Star"
Feb 1946 – 1968
Nov 1973 – July 2004
Texas National Guard

50th Armored Division "Jersey Blues"
July 1946 – Sept 1993
New Jersey National Guard

== See also ==
- Corps insignia of the United States Army
- Brigade insignia of the United States Army
- Miscellaneous shoulder sleeve insignia of the United States Army
- Obsolete shoulder sleeve insignia of the United States Army
