= List of corps of the United States =

This is a list of field corps of the United States and Confederate States armies and the United States Marine Corps.

== Active corps ==
As of March 2024, there are four active Army corps.

- I Corps
- III Corps
- V Corps
- XVIII Airborne Corps
- Judge Advocate General's Corps
- Military Police Corps

== Former corps of the World War/Cold War/Gulf War eras ==
- I Armored Corps
- II Corps
- II Armored Corps
- III Armored Corps
- IV Corps
- IV Armored Corps
- VI Corps
- VII Corps
- VIII Corps
- IX Corps
- X Corps
- XI Corps
- XII Corps
- XIII Corps
- XIV Corps
- XV Corps
- XVI Corps
- XIX Corps
- XX Corps
- XXI Corps
- XXII Corps
- XXIII Corps
- XXIV Corps
- XXXIII Corps – World War II – see Fourteenth United States Army
- XXXV Airborne Corps – World War II deception formation – see Operation Pastel
- XXXVI Corps (1944–1945)
- U.S. XXXVII Corps- World War II – see Fourteenth United States Army
- I Field Force, Vietnam
- II Field Force, Vietnam

== World War II U.S. Marine Corps corps ==
- I Marine Amphibious Corps
- III Amphibious Corps
- V Amphibious Corps

== Spanish–American War corps ==
- First Army Corps (Spanish–American War)
- Second Army Corps (Spanish–American War)
- Third Army Corps (Spanish–American War)
- Fourth Army Corps (Spanish–American War)
- Fifth Army Corps (Spanish–American War)
- Sixth Army Corps (Spanish–American War)
- Seventh Army Corps (Spanish–American War)
- Eighth Army Corps (Spanish–American War)

== Civil War Union Army corps ==
- I Corps
- II Corps
- III Corps
- IV Corps
- V Corps
- VI Corps
- VII Corps
- VIII Corps
- IX Corps
- X Corps
- XI Corps
- XII Corps
- XIII Corps
- XIV Corps
- XV Corps
- XVI Corps
- XVII Corps
- XVIII Corps
- XIX Corps
- XX Corps
- XXI Corps
- XXII Corps
- XXIII Corps
- XXIV Corps
- XXV Corps
- Cavalry Corps

== Confederate States Army corps ==
- First Corps, Army of the Mississippi
- Second Corps, Army of the Mississippi
- Third Corps, Army of the Mississippi
- First Corps, Army of Northern Virginia
- Second Corps, Army of Northern Virginia
- Third Corps, Army of Northern Virginia
- Fourth Corps, Army of Northern Virginia
- Cavalry Corps, Army of Northern Virginia
- First Corps, Army of the Potomac
- Second Corps, Army of the Potomac
- First Corps, Army of Tennessee
- Second Corps, Army of Tennessee
