= First United States Army Group =

Fictitious WWII Allied military unit

- Insignia of First United States Army Group
- Active: 1943–44
- Country: United States
- Branch: United States Army
- Type: Army group
- Role: Military diversion, phantom formation

Commanders
- Notable commanders: Omar N. Bradley; Courtney Hodges; George S. Patton; Lesley J. McNair; William H. Simpson; John L. DeWitt

First United States Army Group (often abbreviated FUSAG) was a fictitious (paper command) Allied Army Group in World War II prior to D-Day, part of Operation Quicksilver, used to deceive the Germans about where the Allies would land in France. Originally a real but skeleton formation for U.S. General Omar Bradley's planning activities for the invasion, it fell into disuse before being fictitiously reactivated with prominent general George S. Patton named as commander to attract German attention.

== History ==
First U.S. Army Group was activated in London in 1943 as the planning formation for the Allied invasion of France under General Omar Bradley. When Twelfth United States Army Group was activated on 1 August 1944, Bradley and his staff transferred to the headquarters of the new army group. Despite a lack of personnel, FUSAG continued to exist on paper as part of the deception of Operation Quicksilver. In order to make the German forces believe the Allied invasion would come at Pas de Calais, the phantom force was stationed at Dover, directly across the English Channel from the site. To further attract the Axis commanders' attention, General Dwight D. Eisenhower placed George S. Patton, considered by the Germans to be a formidable offensive commander, in command of the phantom force, and increased the formation's apparent size to be larger than the British-led 21 Army Group under Bernard Montgomery. Patton, however, was actually temporarily unemployed as punishment for slapping a battle-fatigued soldier in Sicily.

The deception worked so well that significant German forces remained in the Pas de Calais region for seven weeks after the real invasion at Normandy to defend against what they thought would be the true invasion force.

Agents infiltrated by Germany into the United Kingdom who became double agents acting for Britain in the Double Cross System—notably Juan Pujol García (Garbo)—played a vital role in persuading the Germans that FUSAG was real. After it had become clear that Normandy, not Calais, was the invasion site, to preserve the credibility of the Double Cross network's agents in spite of the totally false information they had persuaded the Germans to believe, the Germans were persuaded that FUSAG had been real, but had been disbanded and attached to the forces at Normandy because the Normandy "diversion" had been so successful that the Calais landing had become unnecessary.

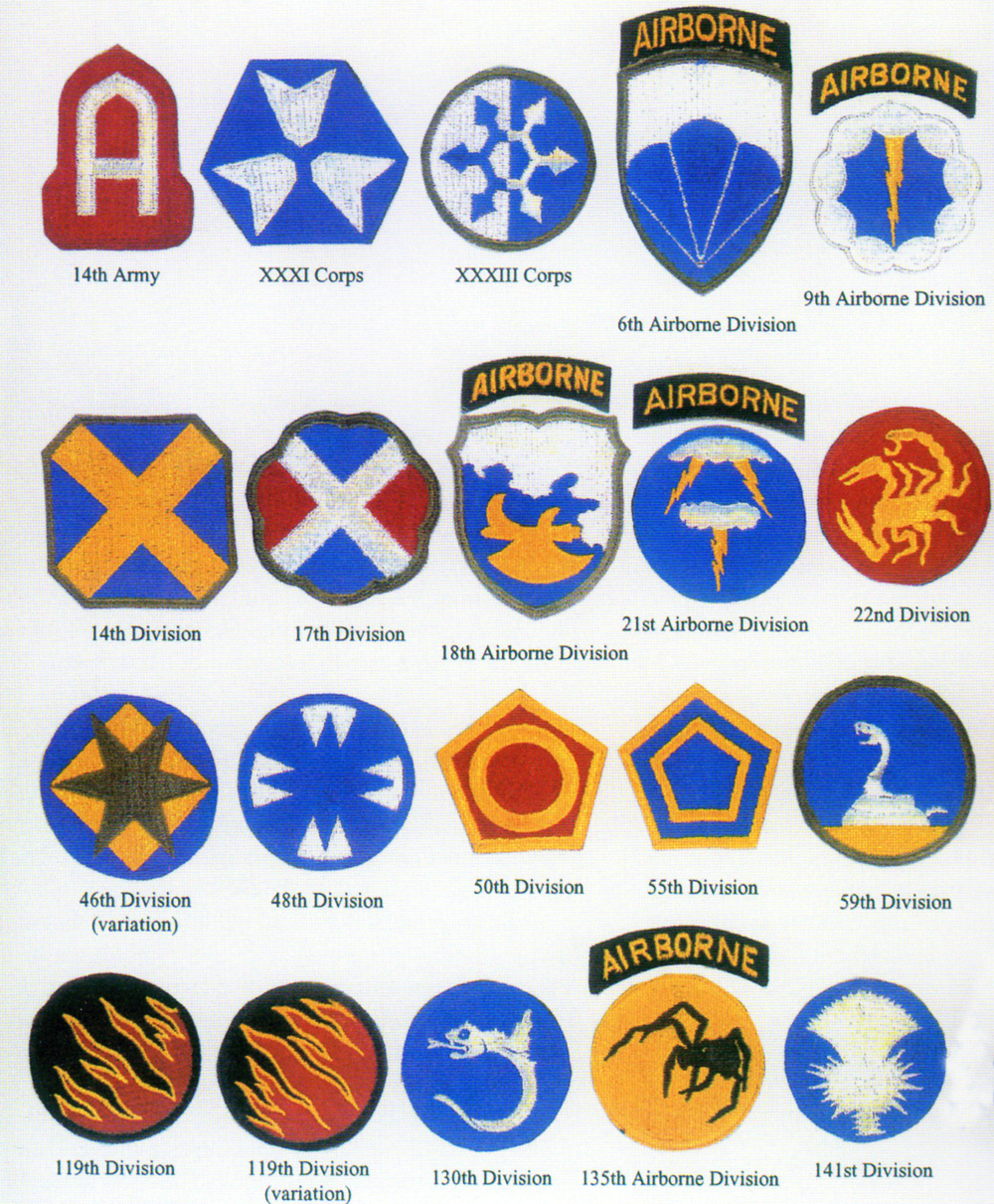
Shoulder patches of some nonexistent units of FUSAG

== Subordinate units ==
What follows is the order of battle for the First United States Army Group at one point during Operation Fortitude. The various formations changed as the operation continued in order to mislead Axis intelligence.

- First United States Army Group
  - British Fourth Army; fictitious (was real in WWI) – Edinburgh
    - British 2nd Airborne Division; fictitious – Bulford
    - British VII Corps; notional – Dundee
      - 55th Infantry Division (United States); fictitious – Iceland
      - 80th Division; fictitious – southern England
      - 7th, 9th, and 10th US Ranger Battalions; fictitious – Iceland
    - British II Corps; notional – Stirling
      - 55th (West Lancashire) Infantry Division; notional — Three Bridges
      - 58th Infantry Division; fictitious — Gravesend
      - 35th Armoured Brigade; notional — Maresfield
  - US 14th Army; fictitious — Little Waltham
    - 9th Airborne Division; fictitious — Leicester
    - 21st Airborne Division; fictitious — Fulbeck
    - XXXIII Corps; fictitious — HQ Bury St Edmunds
      - 11th Infantry Division; fictitious — Bury St Edmunds
      - 48th Infantry Division; fictitious — Woodbridge
      - 25th Armored Division; fictitious — East Dereham
    - XXXVII Corps; fictitious — HQ Chelmsford
      - 17th Infantry Division; fictitious — Hatfield Peverel
      - 59th Infantry Division; fictitious — Ipswich
  - Ninth United States Army; fictitious until 15 April 1944, when the name was taken by a new – real – US field army, which deployed to battle September 1944

== See also ==
- Operation Fortitude
- Operation Bodyguard
