= List of American Army Groups in World War II =

A list of American Army Groups in World War II.

== Military groups ==
- First United States Army Group — Fictitious formation, created as a part of Operation Quicksilver.
- 6th Army Group - Served in France and Germany from 15 September 1944 to 15 June 1945. (Consisted of Seventh United States Army and French First Army)
- 12th Army Group - Served in France and Germany from 1 August 1944 until 12 July 1945. (Consisted of First, Third, Ninth and Fifteenth United States Armies.)
- 15th Army Group — Had overall command of the Allied Armies in Italy, became operation at Algiers on 10 July 1943 and disbanded on 5 July 1945. (Consisted of Fifth United States Army and British Eighth Army.)
- 21st Army Group - Not an American unit. (Consisted of British Second Army and Canadian First Army.)

== See also ==
- Military history of the United States during World War II
- United States in World War II (disambiguation)
