= 19th Division (United States) =

19th Infantry Division 109th Infantry Division
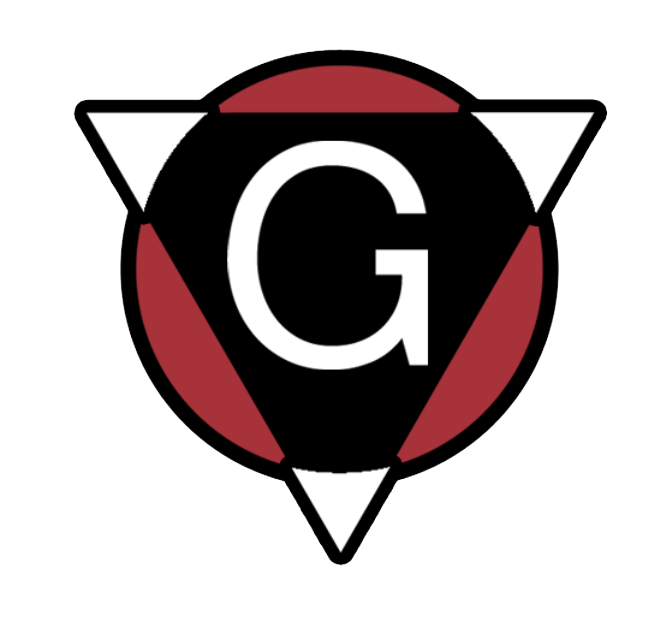
- Active: 1917–19; 1944 (notional); 1947
- Country: United States
- Branch: United States Army
- Role: Phantom formation (in WWII)
- Size: Division
- Engagements: World War I World War II: Operation Fortitude

Commanders
- Notable commanders: Brigadier General Benjamin T. Simmons

There have been a number of 19th Divisions in the history of the United States Army.

The first 19th Division was a National Guard division established in early 1917 consisting of Arizona, California, Colorado, Nevada, New Mexico, and Utah. By the end of that same year, the 19th Division became the 40th Division.

== History ==
=== World War I ===
The 19th Division was organized on 1 September 1918 as a Regular Army and National Army division for service in the American Expeditionary Force from a mixture of existing and newly-raised units, however the division did not go overseas and demobilized in February 1919 at Camp Dodge, Iowa.

==== Organization ====
The 19th Division gained the nickname "Twilight Division" and was composed of the following units, not all of which joined before the Armistice:

- 37th Infantry Brigade
  - 14th Infantry Regiment
  - 87th Infantry Regiment
  - 55th Machine Gun Battalion
- 38th Infantry Brigade
  - 2nd Infantry Regiment
  - 88th Infantry Regiment
    - 56th Machine Gun Battalion
- 19th Field Artillery Brigade
  - 55th Field Artillery Regiment
  - 56th Field Artillery Regiment
  - 57th Field Artillery Regiment
  - 19th Trench Mortar Battery
- Headquarters
  - 55th Machine Gun Battalion
  - 219th Engineers
  - 219th Signa Battalion
  - Division Trains

=== World War II ===
The third iteration was the 19th Armored Division was constituted in the Army of the United States on 18 January 1943, however, it was never officially activated during the war.

The "19th Infantry Division" was a "phantom division" used as part of Allied deception measures. It was notionally assigned to SHAEF for use in Operation Fortitude South, but was never actually utilized during that endeavor.

The division's order of battle included the following fictional units:

- Headquarters, 19th Infantry Division
- 572nd Infantry Regiment
- 573rd Infantry Regiment
- 578th Infantry Regiment
- Divisional Troops

In July 1944, it was redesignated as the 109th Infantry Division.

=== Cold War ===
On 1 July 1946, the 19th Armored Division was allotted to the Organized Reserve. The headquarters was activated on 15 January 1947 at Los Angeles, California, and the Headquarters Company was activated on 1 July 1947. Both units were inactivated on 20 August 1947 and reflagged as the 13th Armored Division and activated the next day. The 19th Armored Division was disbanded on 21 March 1952.

== See also ==
- Formations of the United States Army in the early 20th Century
- Omar Bradley served with this division in World War I
