= List of field armies of the United States Army =

Below is a list of Field Armies of the United States

== Active Theater Armies ==
- First United States Army (United States Army Western Hemisphere Command)
- United States Army Central (United States Central Command)
- United States Army North (United States Northern Command)
- United States Army South (United States Southern Command)
- United States Army Europe and Africa (United States European Command, United States Africa Command)

== Active Field Armies ==
- Eighth United States Army (United States Forces Korea)

== Inactive ==
- Second United States Army (United States Army Cyber Command)
- Fourth United States Army
- Tenth United States Army
- Fourteenth United States Army (fictional)
- Fifteenth United States Army
