= 63rd Infantry Regiment (United States) =

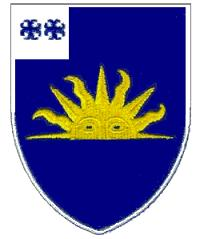
- Distinctive unit insignia
- Active: 1917-1922; 1941-1956
- Country: United States
- Branch: United States Army
- Type: Infantry
- Size: Regiment
- Motto: none
- Engagements: World War II

The 63rd Infantry Regiment was a Regular infantry regiment in the United States Army.

== Lineage ==
The regiment was constituted on 15 May 1917 in the Regular Army as the 63rd Infantry. It was organized on 1 June 1917 at the Presidio of San Francisco, California, from personnel of the 12th Infantry Regiment, and was assigned to the 11th Division on 5 July 1918. After the armistice, it was relieved from the 11th Division on 29 November 1918. The regiment was stationed at Madison Barracks, New York, as of June 1919 as a separate regiment. Concurrently, the 2nd Battalion was transferred to Fort Ontario, New York, and the 3rd Battalion was transferred to Plattsburg Barracks, New York, The entire regiment was transferred in September 1921 to Plattsburg Barracks. The 63rd Infantry was inactivated at Plattsburg Barracks and disbanded 31 July 1922. It was reconstituted in the Regular Army on 10 May 1941, activated 1 June 1941 at Fort Leonard Wood, Missouri, and concurrently assigned to the 6th Infantry Division. The regiment was inactivated on 10 January 1949 in Korea, activated on 4 October 1950 at Fort Ord, California, and inactivated for a final time on 3 April 1956 at Fort Ord.

== Campaign streamers ==
World War II

- New Guinea
- Luzon (with arrowhead)

== Decorations ==
- Presidential Unit Citation Streamer embroidered MOUNT SANTO DOMINGO (2nd Battalion cited)
- Presidential Unit Citation Streamer embroidered MONTALBAN LUZON (3rd Battalion cited)
- Philippine Presidential Unit Citation Streamer embroidered 17 OCTOBER 1944 to 4 JULY 1945

== Distinctive unit Insignia ==
The shield of the COA.

== Coat of arms ==
The shield is Infantry blue with demi-sun. A rising sun is on the arms of the state of New York, and California is the state of the setting sun. The 63rd Infantry was originally organized in California and after World War I performed guard duty in New York state. The 12th Infantry from which the personnel were drawn, is indicated by the canton

== See also ==
- Distinctive unit insignia
