= List of formations of the United States Army during the Mexican Revolution =

The formations of the United States Army during the Mexican Revolution reflected the United States' desire to field modernized divisions to test the United States' preparedness for war. As these early divisions were designed to defend and fight in the United States, higher commands were divided into departments and artillery districts.

Divisions in the United States Army at this time were numbered in consecutive order and were not differentiated by type (save for the short-lived Maneuver Division and Cavalry Division).

Departments formed from 1913 included the Central Department, the Eastern Department, the Southern Department, and the Western Department. Artillery districts included the Northern Atlantic Coast Artillery District, Southern Atlantic Coast Artillery District, and the Pacific Coast Artillery District.

== Divisions ==
- Maneuver Division (1911) (see History of the United States Army#Twentieth century)
- 1st Division
- 2nd Division
- 3rd Division
- Cavalry Division
- 5th Division (see 26th Infantry Division)
- 6th Division (see 27th Infantry Division)
- 7th Division (see 28th Infantry Division)
- 8th Division (see 29th Infantry Division)
- 9th Division (see 30th Infantry Division)
- 10th Division (see 31st Infantry Division)
- 11th Division (see 32nd Infantry Division)
- 12th Division (see 33rd Infantry Division)
- 13th Division (see 34th Infantry Division)
- 14th Division (see 35th Infantry Division)
- 15th Division (see 36th Infantry Division)
- 16th Division (see 37th Infantry Division)
- 17th Division (see 38th Infantry Division)
- 18th Division (see 39th Infantry Division)
- 19th Division (see 40th Infantry Division)
- 20th Division (see 41st Infantry Division)
- Pancho Villa Expedition ("Punitive Expedition")

== See also ==
- Formations of the United States Army
- United States involvement in the Mexican Revolution
- United States occupation of Veracruz
- Border War (1910-1918)
- Bandit War
