= Operation Pastel =

Planned deception operation for the invasion of Japan during WW2

During World War II, Operation Pastel was the U.S. deception plan scheduled to protect Operation Olympic, the planned invasion of Kyushu, one of Japan's southern home islands. Pastel aimed to create the false impression of a threat of an American-led invasion against ports in China via attacks on Formosa, and another threat of an invasion of Shikoku.

The strategic deception component of Pastel mainly surrounded two major fictitious invasions. The first against the Chusan Archipelago-Shanghai area, based on the cancelled Operation Longtom, with a notionally scheduled landing date of October 1, 1945. The other was an invasion of Shikoku, which was notionally scheduled to take place on December 1, 1945. Pastel would convince the Japanese that the Joint Chiefs had rejected the notion of a direct invasion and instead were going to attempt to encircle and bombard Japan. This would require capturing bases in Formosa, along the Chinese coast, and in the Yellow Sea area. However, as the actual build-up of American forces would clearly be directed towards Japan, the assault on China would then appear to be cancelled, with a new invasion seemingly being planned against Shikoku instead.

One of the notional military formations that was designated for use in the deception was the fictitious XXXV Airborne Corps. The Corps formed part of Operation Pastel Two, the deception plan for Operation Olympic. The final version of Operation Pastel incorporated notional airborne landings, using dummy parachutists similar to those used on D-Day, in the interior of Kyūshū the day before the actual landings were to take place on November 1, 1945. The two-division fictional corps that was to carry out the landings was designated XXXV Airborne Corps.

Under Pastel Two, the first elements of the XXXV Airborne Corps, quartering parties of the notional 18th Airborne Division, were depicted as reaching Okinawa on August 15, 1945. Following this, glider pilots would reach Okinawa around August 20, 1945, followed by the troops of the real 11th (in the Philippines) and notional 18th Airborne Divisions, starting to arrive in Okinawa on September 1, 1945. On the same day, the notional corps headquarters would have been activated.

== Sources ==
- Skates, John Ray (1994). The Invasion of Japan: Alternative to the Bomb. Columbia, SC: University of South Carolina Press. ISBN 978-0-87249-972-0.
- Holt, Thaddeus (2005). The Deceivers: Allied Military Deception in the Second World War. Phoenix. ISBN 0-75381-917-1.
- Huber, Dr Thomas M. (1988). PASTEL: Deception in the Invasion of Japan (PDF). Combat Studies Institute. Archived from the original (PDF) on 2013-03-03.
