= XXXIII Corps (United States) =

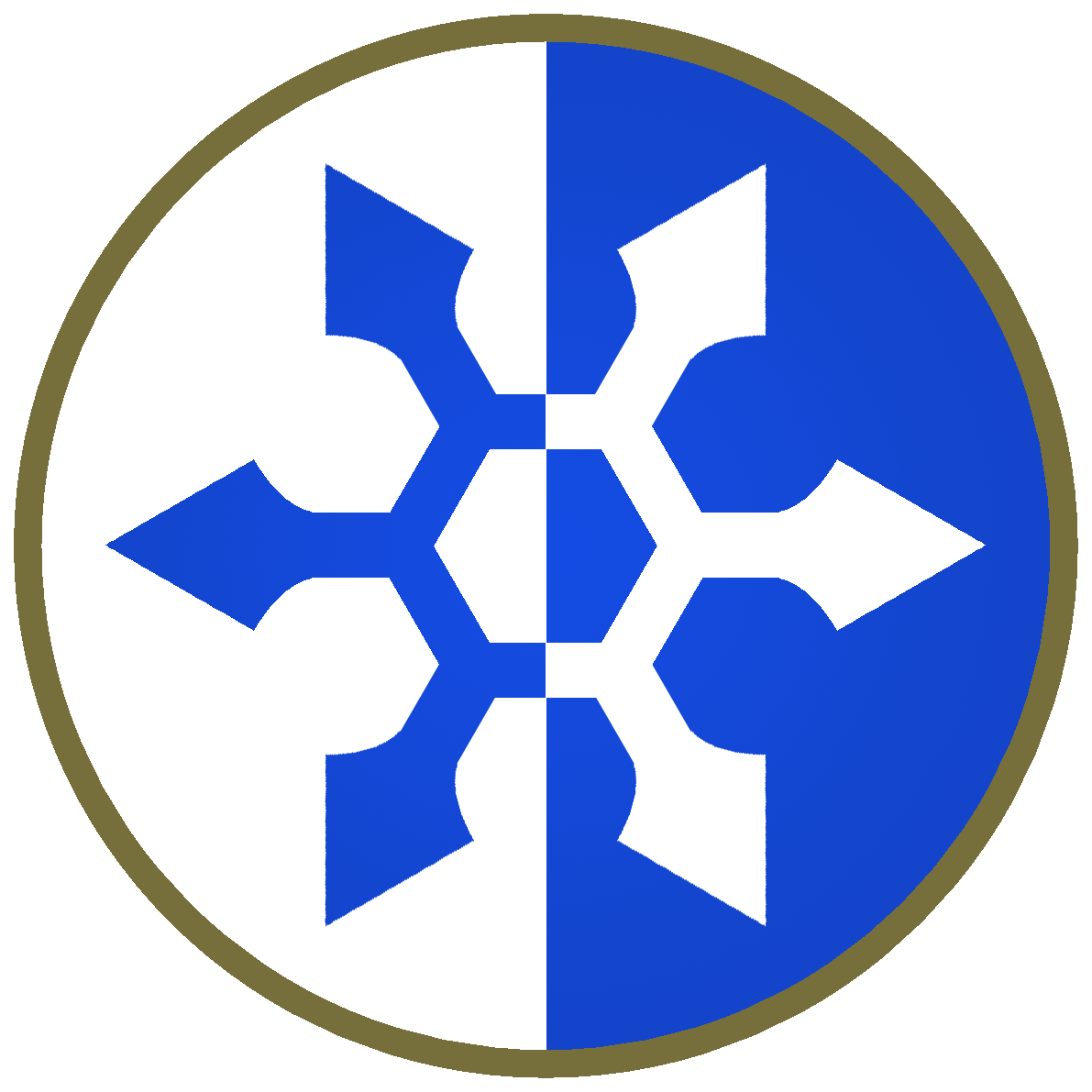
- Shoulder sleeve insignia
- Active: Operation Quicksilver
- Country: United States of America
- Branch: United States Army
- Type: Phantom formation

The US XXXIII Corps (33rd Corps) was a 'Phantom Unit' created in 1944 as part of Fortitude South II.

== World War II ==
The corps was first reported to the Germans as arriving in June 1944, disembarking at Liverpool and establishing its headquarters in Marbury, Cheshire, with the US 11th Infantry Division, US 48th Infantry Division and US 25th Armored Division under its command. In July the corps and the units under its command were reported as moving to take up positions vacated by US XX Corps as it departed for Normandy.

With its headquarters at Bury St Edmunds, Suffolk, the corps had the role of following up the landings by US XXXVII Corps and British II Corps in the Pas de Calais.

Following the conclusion of Fortitude South II it was reported as having moved to Romsey in August 1944. During September the control of US 25th Armored Division passed to US XXXVII Corps and the US 17th Infantry Division became part of US XXXIII Corps. In October 1944 it was announced to the Germans that the corps had been disbanded to provide replacements for other units.
