= 17th Infantry Division (United States) =

17th Division
- Active: 1917–19
- Country: United States
- Branch: United States Army
- Type: Infantry
- Size: Division
- Garrison/HQ: Camp Kearny, California

Commanders
- Notable commanders: Henry Clay Hodges Jr. Terry Allen

The 17th Division of the United States Army was formed twice during the First World War. It was then recreated a third time as a Second World War 'phantom division' as part of Fortitude South II.

== History ==
=== World War I ===
The 17th Division first appeared on the rolls of the U.S. Army as a National Guard division. After being activated as a National Guard division, it was quickly redesignated the 38th Division.

The 17th Division was reestablished in 1918 as a war service (National Army) division. The 17th Division included the 33rd Infantry Brigade (September 1918 – February 1919), with the 5th and 83rd Regiments, and the 34th Brigade with the 29th and 84th Regiments. It also included the 17th Field Artillery Brigade. The 5th Infantry Regiment was assigned on 27 July 1918 to the 17th Division and relieved on 10 February 1919. The 17th Division was intended to be a replacement and school division. The 17th Division did not go overseas and demobilized in January 1919 at Camp Beauregard, Louisiana.

=== World War II ===
17th Infantry Division (deception)
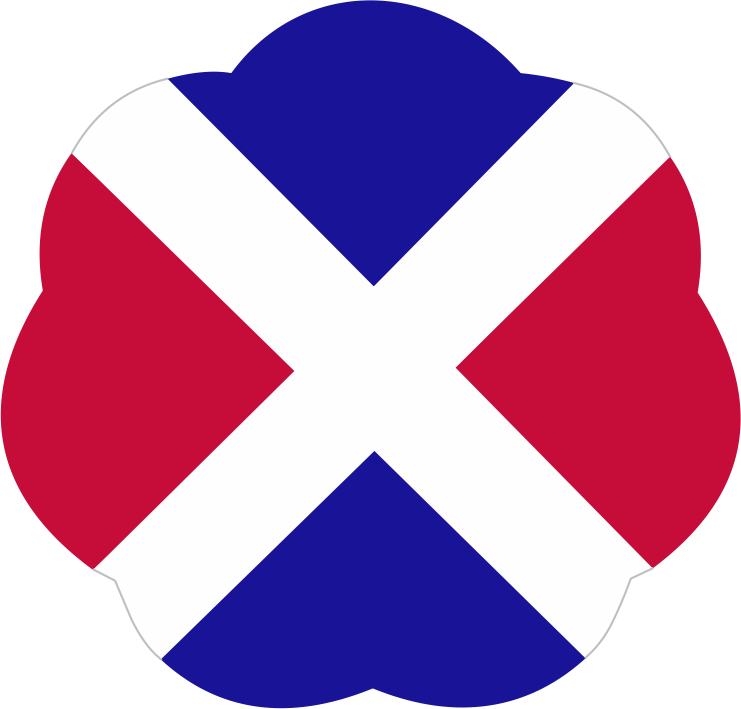
- Active: 1944 Operation Fortitude
- Country: United States
- Branch: United States Army
- Role: Infantry
- Size: Division
- Part of: XXXIII Corps
- Garrison/HQ: Birmingham, Staffordshire (fictional)

In 1943-44 it was decided to 'reform' the 17th Infantry Division as a military deception. The division was depicted as arriving in England in June 1944, where it came under the control of US XXXVII Corps, US 14th Army, initially the division was located around Birmingham, Staffordshire prior to the division moving to Hatfield Peverel in Essex during July 1944. Depicted as one of the assault divisions in the Pas de Calais landings it would have landed to the left of the US 59th Infantry Division and been followed by the US 25th Armored Division of the US XXXIII Corps.

In the aftermath of Fortitude South II was depicted as moving to the region around Brighton-Burgess Hill during August 1944 where it was notionally placed under the command of US XXXIII Corps. In October 1944 the division moved to South Wales and was disposed of by announcing that it had been disbanded to provide replacements for other units.

In addition to the usual divisional support units the 17th Infantry Division was notionally composed of:

- 293rd Infantry Regiment
- 336th Infantry Regiment
- 375th Infantry Regiment
