= United States in World War II =

The United States participated in World War II in many different ways:

- United States home front during World War II
- Military history of the United States during World War II

== See also ==
- United States non-interventionism before entering World War II
