= United States Army deception formations of World War II =

Non-existent US Army units used in deception operations

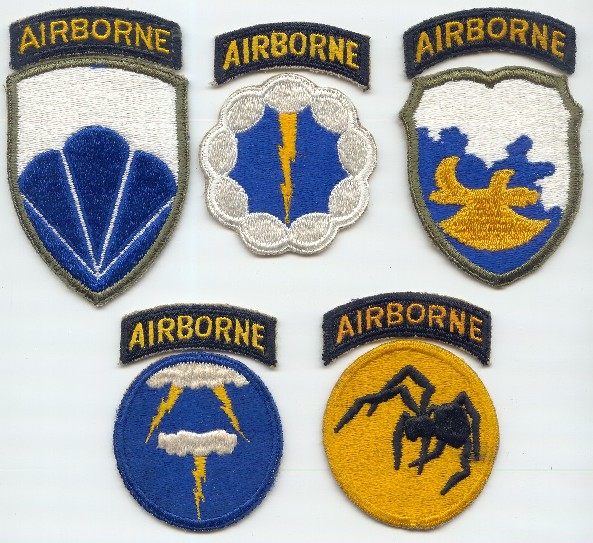
Patches of the notional 6th, 9th, 18th, 21st & 135th Airborne Divisions

The United States Army created a large number of notional deception formations that were used in a number of World War II deception operations. The most notable fictional US formation was the First United States Army Group (FUSAG); this force was originally intended as the main invasion force for the Invasion of Normandy. However, the British 21st Army Group took up this role. FUSAG remained in existence on paper and was used during Operation Fortitude South to divert Axis attention to the Pas de Calais area.

The imaginary formations ranged in size from battalion to field army and were faked using documents, photographs, double agents, news reportage and physical subterfuge. Some of the units were either based on previously active formations (usually World War I formations) or created afresh. Many were used multiple times. British deception specialist Dudley Clarke, in particular, believed that reusing units in the long term would help establish their existence in the mind of the enemy.

== Field armies and army groups ==
Formation	Dates	Insignia	Subordinates	Operations	Description
1st US Army Group (FUSAG)	1943 – October 1944		First Canadian Army; Third US Army; Ninth US Army; Fourteenth US Army; British Fourth Army; First Allied Airborne Army (August 1944–)	Fortitude South	Created for the planning of the invasion of Normandy, the FUSAG later became redundant and was used to mislead Axis that the Allies intended a major invasion at Pas de Calais. Later utilised to threaten airborne landings in September 1944.
2nd US Army Group (SUSAG)	1943 – 1944		None	None	Originally intended to take the role of the FUSAG, but when the latter's job was taken over by the 12th Army Group the formation became redundant.
Twelfth Army			None	None	Activated as part of SHAEF, never used.
Fourteenth Army	May 1944 – October 1944		XXXIII Corps; XXXVII Corps; 9th Airborne Division; 21st Airborne Division	Fortitude South	A subordinate of FUSAG, supposedly landed in Liverpool and stationed in Little Waltham, Essex. Moved from FUSAG to SHAEF later in the year; double agents reported to the Germans that it was largely made up of US convicts.

=== Corps ===
Formation	Dates	Insignia	Subordinates	Operations	Description
IX Amphibious Corps	1944		108th Infantry Division; 119th Infantry Division; 130th Infantry Division; 141st Infantry Division; 157th Infantry Division	Wedlock	The notional amphibious component of the Ninth Fleet established in Alaska. Used to convey to the Japanese that the United States planned to attack the Kuriles rather than the Marianas.
XXX Corps			None	Fortitude South	Activated as part of SHAEF, never used.
XXXI Corps	1944		91st Infantry Division; French 1st Armored Division; Algerian 7th Infantry Division; Algerian 8th Infantry Division; British 42nd Infantry Division (Vendetta); US 14th Infantry Division (Ferdinand); US 22nd Infantry Division (Ferdinand)	Vendetta; Ferdinand	
XXXIII Corps	1944		11th Infantry Division; 48th Infantry Division; 25th Armored Division	Fortitude South	
XXXV Airborne Corps	1945		11th Airborne Division; 18th Airborne Division	Pastel Two	Formed part of Operation Pastel Two, the planned deception for Operation Olympic, but never formally used. The final version of Operation Pastel incorporated notional airborne landings, using dummy parachutists in the interior of Kyushu. XXXV Airborne Corps was designated as carrying out this task. Had Operation Pastel been carried out, the first elements of the Corps, quartering parties of the notional 18th Airborne Division, would have been depicted as reaching Okinawa on 15 August 1945. Following this glider pilots were to have been depicted as reaching Okinawa around 20 August 1945, followed by the troops of the real 11th and 18th Airborne Divisions, starting to arrive in Okinawa on 1 September 1945.
XXXVII Corps	1944		17th Infantry Division; 59th Infantry Division	Fortitude South	
XXXVIII Corps			None	Fortitude South	Activated as part of SHAEF, never used.
XXXIX Corps			None	Fortitude South	Activated as part of SHAEF, never used.

=== Divisions ===
Formation	Dates	Insignia	Subordinates	Operations	Description
6th Airborne Division	May – July 1944		517th Regimental Combat Team; 460th Field Artillery Battalion; 550th Airborne Battalion	'Operation Vendetta', 1944.	This notional formation was 'built up' around real units, the 517th Regimental Combat Team, 1st Battalion, 551st Parachute Infantry Regiment & the 550th Airborne Infantry Battalion which were depicted as operating under a single command when in fact they were operating separately. Supposedly arrived in Sicily from the United States in May 1944. It was notionally attached to the Seventh United States Army and was to be dropped on the town of Paulhan in France to support a fictional invasion of the Narbonne region. It was disposed of by announcing in July 1944 that the division had been disbanded.
9th Airborne Division	June – November 1944		523rd Parachute Infantry Regiment; 196th Glider Infantry Regiment; 199th Glider Infantry Regiment	Fortitude South	
11th Infantry Division	? – October 1944		178th Infantry Regiment; 352nd Infantry Regiment; 392nd Infantry Regiment	Fortitude South	
14th Infantry Division	June - September 1944			Ferdinand	Activated as part of SHAEF.
17th Infantry Division	June – October 1944		293rd Infantry Regiment; 336th Infantry Regiment; 375th Infantry Regiment	Fortitude South	
18th Airborne Division			566th Parachute Infantry Regiment; 567th Glider Infantry Regiment; 570th Glider Infantry Regiment	Dervish (1945); Pastel Two	Dervish was an unrealized deception plan intended to further strain the German war effort in early 1945. It sought to depict a large-scale airborne threat to the strategically vital Stendal–Brandenburg–Wittenberg–Magdeburg region, with the airborne force possessing the resources to support itself for thirty days. Although Dervish ultimately came to nothing, the notional 18th Airborne Division was activated in the United States to support this effort, and plans were made to depict it being deployed to Europe. The 18th Airborne was later designated for use in Pastel, the deception plan to protect Operation Olympic, the planned invasion of Kyushu.
21st Airborne Division	June – November 1944		521st Parachute Infantry Regiment; 277th Glider Infantry Regiment; 278th Glider Infantry Regiment	Fortitude South	The division was initially depicted as being under the direct command of US 14th Army with its headquarters located in Fulbeck, Lincolnshire in June 1944. In the Pas de Calais landings it and the 9th Airborne Division were to be dropped behind the XXXVII Corps beachheads. In August 1944 it was notionally transferred to the direct command of First United States Army Group, where it assisted in the training of the U.S. 48th Infantry Division in air landing techniques. In the aftermath of Fortitude South, the notional U.S. 9th and 21st Airborne Divisions, the notional British 2nd Airborne Division, and the real United States 17th Airborne Division were used to depict an airborne threat to the Kiel-Bremen area, supporting Operation Market Garden. In November 1944 it was announced that the division had been merged with the 9th Airborne Division to form the 13th Airborne Division, a real unit that was about to be deployed to France.
22nd Infantry Division	June - September 1944			Ferdinand	
46th Infantry Division	December 1943 – March 1944			Operation Fortitude	
48th Infantry Division	June – December 1944		80th Infantry Regiment; 95th Infantry Regiment; 146th Infantry Regiment	Fortitude South	The 48th Infantry Division was "created" in 1944 as an 'phantom division'. It formed part of Operation Quicksilver and Fortitude South II to replace the real 6th Armored Division when it moved to Normandy. The division was presented to the Germans as a well trained unit that had been formed at Camp Clatsop, Oregon, in 1942. Following training at the Desert Training Center and maneuvers in the Olympic Peninsula the division had guarded the ALCAN Highway before being shipped to England in June 1944, where Agent Garbo reported that the uncle of one of his agents (An American NCO in the ETO Services of Supply.) was a member of the division, which was not at the time he made the report under the command of either the First US Army Group or the 21st Army Group. After disembarkation, the division established its initial headquarters at Newcastle-under-Lyme in Staffordshire before moving to Woodbridge in Suffolk. There, as part of the U.S. XXXIII Corps (United States) of the US 14th Army it was assigned the role of following up the Pas de Calais landings. Following Fortitude South II the division was depicted as moving to Brockenhurst in Hampshire where it carried out air landing training in conjunction with the US 21st Airborne Division. In December 1944 the division was depicted as moving to Dundee in Scotland where it was disbanded at the start of 1945, with some soldiers being used as replacements for other units while a small cadre returned to the United States.
50th Infantry Division			None	None	
55th Infantry Division	October 1943 – March 1945		78th Infantry Regiment; 83rd Infantry Regiment; 96th Infantry Regiment	Fortitude North	
59th Infantry Division			94th Infantry Regiment; 139th Infantry Regiment; 171st Infantry Regiment	Fortitude South	
15th Armored Division			None	None	Activated as part of SHAEF, never used.
25th Armored Division			72nd Tank Battalion; 73rd Tank Battalion; 74th Tank Battalion; 498th Armored Infantry Battalion; 499th Armored Infantry Battalion; 500th Armored Infantry Battalion	Fortitude South	
39th Armored Division			None	None	Activated as part of SHAEF, never used.
119th Infantry Division			488th Infantry Regiment; 489th Infantry Regiment; 491st Infantry Regiment; 639th Field Artillery Battalion; 640th Field Artillery Battalion; 641st Field Artillery Battalion; 649th Field Artillery Battalion	Wedlock	
130th Infantry Division			492nd Infantry Regiment; 493rd Infantry Regiment; 494th Infantry Regiment; 642nd Field Artillery Battalion; 643rd Field Artillery Battalion; 644th Field Artillery Battalion; 650th Field Artillery Battalion	Wedlock	
135th Airborne Division			551st Parachute Infantry Regiment; 524th Glider Infantry Regiment; 525th Glider Infantry Regiment		
141st Infantry Division			495th Infantry Regiment; 496th Infantry Regiment; 497th Infantry Regiment; 645th Field Artillery Battalion; 646th Field Artillery Battalion; 647th Field Artillery Battalion; 651st Field Artillery Battalion	Wedlock	
157th Infantry Division			557th Infantry Regiment; 558th Infantry Regiment; 565th Infantry Regiment; 944th Field Artillery Battalion; 946th Field Artillery Battalion; 952nd Field Artillery Battalion; 956th Field Artillery Battalion	Wedlock	

== Bibliography ==
- Harris, Tomás (2000). Garbo: The Spy Who Saved D-Day. Public Record Office. ISBN 1-873162-81-2.
- Hesketh, Roger (1999). Fortitude: The D-Day Deception Campaign. St Ermins Press. ISBN 0-316-85172-8.
- Holt, Thaddeus (2004). The Deceivers: Allied Military Deception in the Second World War. Phoenix. ISBN 0-75381-917-1.
- Huber, Dr Thomas M. (1988). PASTEL: Deception in the Invasion of Japan (PDF). Combat Studies Institute. Archived from the original (PDF) on 7 November 2010.
- Rankin, Nicholas (1 October 2008). Churchill's Wizards: The British Genius for Deception, 1914–1945. London: Faber and Faber. ISBN 978-0-571-22195-0.
