= Fourteenth United States Army =

- Shoulder insignia of Fourteenth United States Army
- Active: Operation Quicksilver
- Country: United States
- Allegiance: United States Army
- Branch: Regular Army
- Type: Field army
- Part of: First United States Army Group
- Engagements: World War II

Commanders
- Notable commanders: John P. Lucas

Fourteenth United States Army was a fictitious/military deception field army, under the command of John P. Lucas, developed under Operation Quicksilver as a part of the fictitious First United States Army Group.

== Alleged composition ==
As part of a psychological warfare campaign the Fourteenth Army was described by Agent Garbo in a message sent to German intelligence around 24 August 1944 claiming that his source in the ETO Services of Supply, who had a relative in the US 48th Infantry Division had advised him of:

...a lot of curious things about the basis of the composition of this Fourteenth US Army; amongst them he said that in their ranks there were many convicts who were released from prisons in the United States to be enrolled in a foreign legion of the French or Spanish type. It can almost be said that there are brigades composed of gangsters and bloodthirsty men, specially selected to fight against the Japanese, men who are not supposed to take prisoners, but instead to administer a cruel justice at their own hands.

== Order of battle ==
What follows is the order of battle for the Fourteenth Army at one point during Operation Fortitude. The various formations changed as the operation continued in order to mislead Axis intelligence.

- US 14th Army (Fictional—Little Waltham)
  - 9th Airborne Division (Fictional—Leicester)
  - 21st Airborne Division (Fictional—Fulbeck)
  - XXXIII Corps (Fictional—HQ Bury St Edmunds)
    - 11th Infantry Division (Fictional—Bury St Edmunds)
    - 48th Infantry Division (Fictional—Woodbridge)
    - 25th Armored Division (Fictional—East Dereham)
  - XXXVII Corps (Fictional—HQ Chelmsford)
    - 17th Infantry Division (Fictional—Hatfield Peverel)
    - 59th Infantry Division (Fictional—Ipswich)

== Bibliography ==
- Hesketh, Roger (1999). Fortitude: The D-Day Deception Campaign. St Ermin's Press. ISBN 0-316-85172-8.
- Holt, Thaddeus (2005). The Deceivers: Allied Military Deception in the Second World War. Phoenix. ISBN 0-75381-917-1.
