= XXXVI Corps (United States) =

- Shoulder sleeve insignia of XXXVI Corps
- Active: 10 July 1944–25 September 1945
- Country: United States of America
- Branch: United States Army
- Role: Headquarters
- Size: Corps
- Engagements: World War II; American Theater

Commanders
- Notable commanders: Charles H. Corlett

Insignia
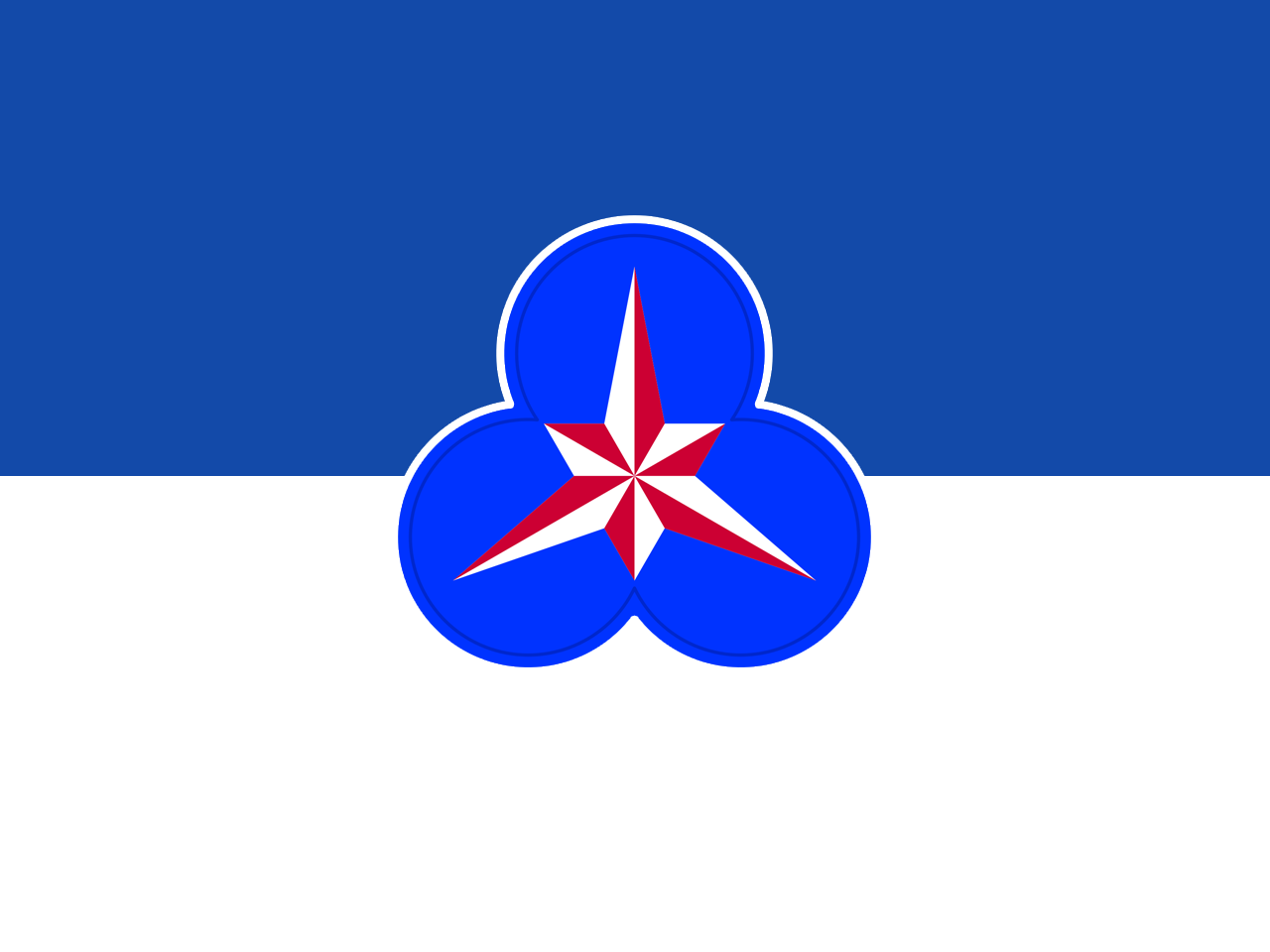
- XXXVI Corps Flag

XXXVI Corps (36th Corps) was a corps-level command of the United States Army during World War II. It remained in the continental United States for the duration of its existence, and was the only activated United States Army corps to not see overseas action in some form during the war.

== History ==
=== World War II ===
XXXVI Corps was activated on 15 July 1944 at Fort Riley, Kansas, under the command of Major General Jonathan W. Anderson and was assigned to the Fourth Army. The shoulder patch was approved on 17 October 1944. A blue trefoil with a six-pointed red and white design indicated the corps' numerical designation. When stations and units assigned to the Second Army located west of the Mississippi River were transferred to the control of the Fourth Army effective 18 September 1944, the XXXVI Corps assumed control of corps-level troop units at Camps Howze and Maxey, Texas, and Camp Robinson, Arkansas. On 6 October 1944, the units at Camp Robinson were relieved from assignment to the XXXVI Corps. The Corps later assumed command of units at Camp Chaffee, Arkansas, and Camp Gruber, Oklahoma. On 5 January 1945, the headquarters of Fourth Army and the Special Troops detachments of Camps Chaffee, Gruber, and Robinson prepared to assume administration of the corps-type units located there, from which the XXXVI Corps was relieved responsibility on 10 January 1945 for an anticipated move to Camp Cooke, California. Instead, the XXXVI Corps received changed orders, recalled its units which had already moved to the West Coast, and moved to Camp Gruber, Oklahoma on 16 January 1945. The corps was relieved of both assignment to Fourth Army and responsibility to units at Camp Gruber at midnight on 23 June 1945 and began movement to Camp Callan, California. It was inactivated there on 25 September 1945.
