= 25th Armored Division (United States) =

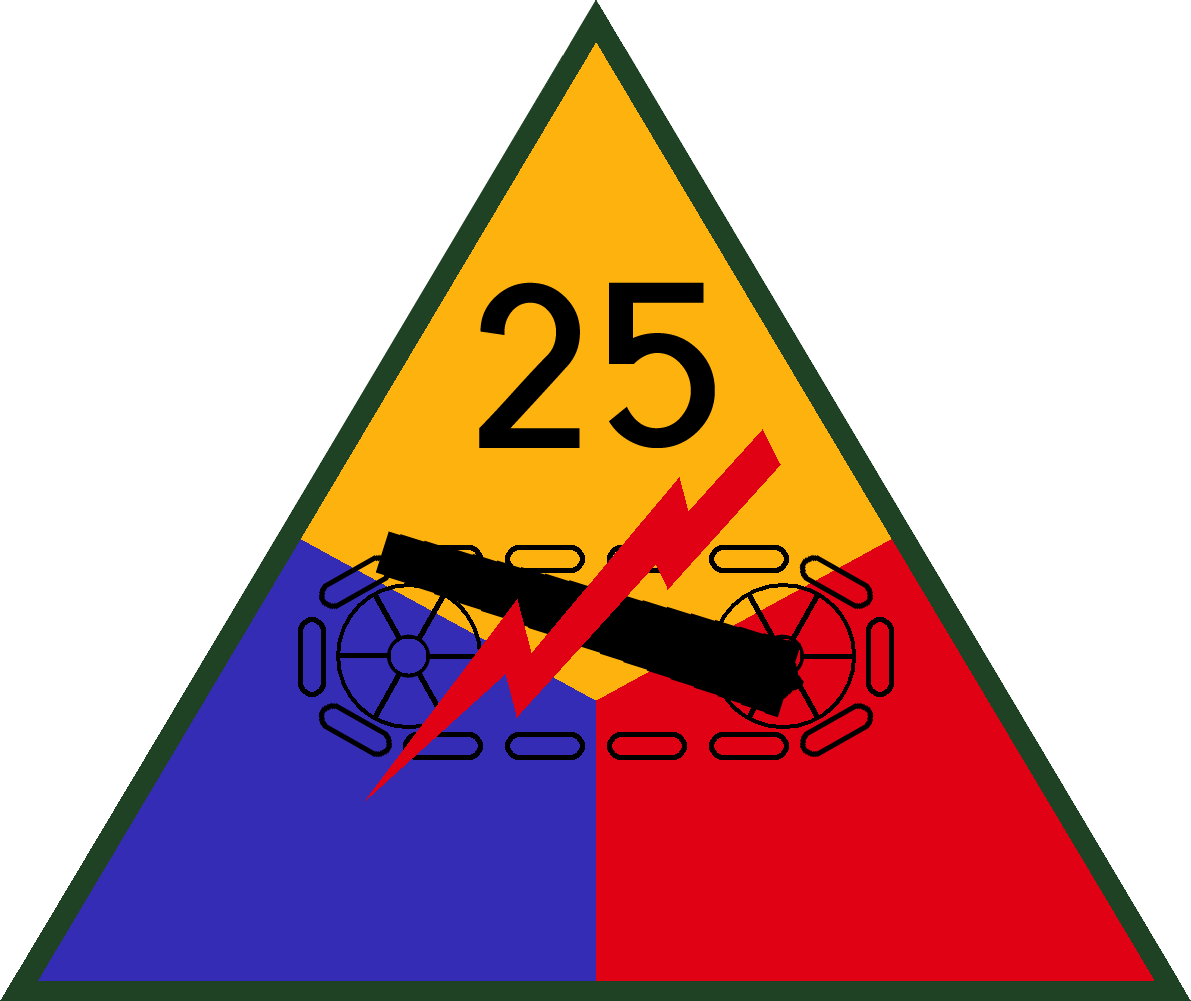
- 25th Armored Division shoulder sleeve insignia
- Active: 1941 Operation Quicksilver
- Country: USA
- Branch: United States Army
- Type: Armored division
- Role: diversion phantom formation

The US 25th Armored Division was a 'phantom division' created in 1944 as part of Fortitude South II to replace the real US 5th Armored Division when that unit was deployed to Normandy.

== World War II ==
As depicted to the Germans the division was formed at Pine Camp, New York in 1941, but did not deploy to England until June 1944 when it joined US XXXIII Corps, US 14th Army. The division was initially based around a headquarters at Wincanton, in Somerset, but moved to the vicinity of East Dereham in Norfolk in July 1944.

In the deception invasion plan for the Pas de Calais, it would have formed with the British 58th Infantry Division the second wave of the invasion, landing on the US 17th Infantry Division beachhead.

In the aftermath of Fortitude South II it was depicted as moving to the area around Tidworth Camp in Hampshire during August 1944 where, during September 1944 it was transferred to the command of US XXXVII Corps. The division was disposed of by announcing that it had departed the United Kingdom via Southampton in October 1944 along with the other units of the US XXXVII Corps.

== Composition ==
In addition to the usual divisional support units the 25th Armored Division was composed of:

- 72nd Tank Battalion
- 73rd Tank Battalion
- 74th Tank Battalion
- 498th Armored Infantry Battalion
- 499th Armored Infantry Battalion
- 500th Armored Infantry Battalion

== In popular culture ==
In the 1988 techno-thriller "Sword Point" by Harold Coyle, the 25th Armored Division is the designation given to one of the formations mobilized to counter a Soviet invasion of Iran.
