= 55th Infantry Division (United States) =

- 55th Infantry Division shoulder sleeve insignia
- Active: 1944
- Country: United States
- Branch: United States Army
- Type: Infantry
- Role: Deception (Operation Fortitude)
- Size: Division
- Engagements: World War II

The US 55th Infantry Division was a "phantom division" created in October 1943 to cover the departure of the US 5th Infantry Division from Iceland. An entirely notional force, its existence was reported to the Germans only through controlled agents as Iceland was too far from Europe to make use of radio deception.

== World War II ==
Between March and July 1944 the division (Along with the fictional 7th, 9th and 10th Ranger Battalions) was presented as being part of the British VII Corps of the British Fourth Army, part of the First United States Army Group. It was a mountain trained division intended to act as the reinforcing unit for the British 52nd Infantry Division in the attack on Narvik. When "Fortitude North" was closed down, the division was presented as being part of a force designed to follow up the German evacuation of Norway. It was disposed of by announcing during late 1944 that the division was leaving Iceland, with the final units leaving by March 1945.

== Composition ==
In addition to the usual divisional support units the 55th Infantry Division was composed of the:

- 78th Infantry Regiment
- 83rd Infantry Regiment
- 96th Infantry Regiment

== In popular culture ==
In the 1993 techno-thriller The Ten Thousand by Harold Coyle, the 55th Mechanized Infantry Division is one of the components of the US Army Tenth Corps, the main US Army formation featured in the novel.

In Anton Myrer's 1968 novel Once An Eagle, the division Sam Damon commands from New Guinea through the Philippines is the 55th, also known as the Salamanders.
