= 11th Infantry Division (United States) =

Former US Army unit

11th Division
- 11th Infantry Division shoulder sleeve insignia
- Active: August 1918 - November 1919
- Country: United States
- Branch: United States Army
- Type: Infantry
- Garrison/HQ: Camp Meade, Maryland
- Nickname: Lafayette Division

Commanders
- Notable commanders: Brigadier General Joseph Alfred Gaston; Major General Jesse McIlvane Carter

The 11th Division, an infantry division of the United States Army, was activated twice during the First World War. During the Second World War the division was notionally reactivated as part of Fortitude South II.

== History ==
=== World War I ===
The 11th Division was first formed as a National Guard division in early 1917 consisting of units of the Michigan and Wisconsin National Guards. By the end of that same year, the 11th Division became the 32nd Division (later 32nd Infantry Division).

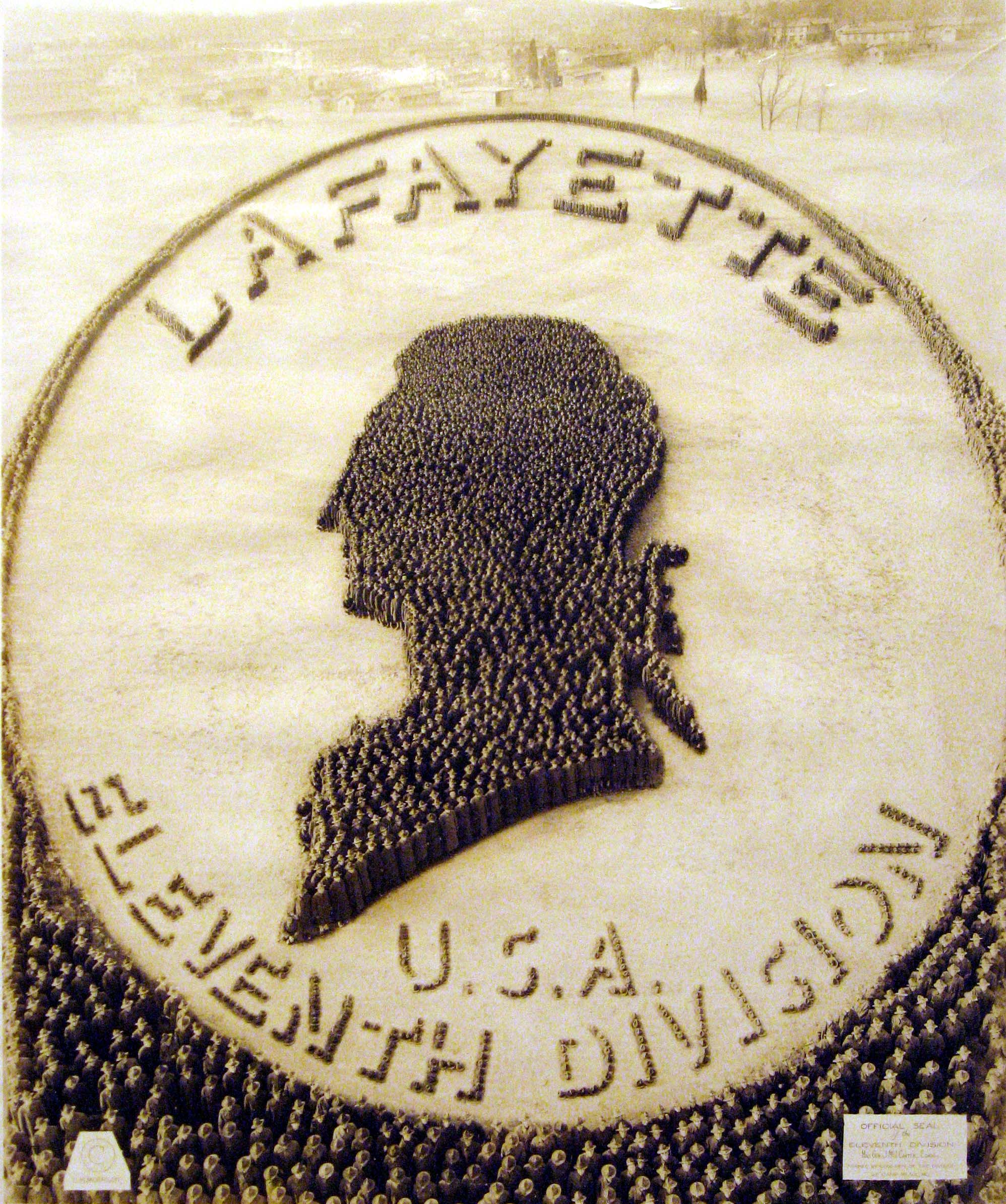
Official Seal of the Eleventh Division, formed by 15,000 men of the 11th division at Camp Meade, Maryland, 1918

The 11th Division was reformed as a National Army division in August 1918 at Camp Meade, Maryland, and was commanded briefly by Brigadier General Joseph Alfred Gaston before Major General Jesse McIlvane Carter took over. The division was nicknamed the Lafayette Division, and its shoulder sleeve insignia included a silhouette of Lafayette. The 17th Infantry Regiment, and the 63rd Infantry Regiment were the two units chosen as the cadre around which the division would be formed. The 71st and 72nd Infantry Regiments were formed from cadres from the 17th and 63rd Regiments. The division's field artillery brigade was trained at West Point, Kentucky, and never actually joined the division at Camp Meade. The division's advanced schools detachment started for England on 25 October 1918, arriving 8 November 1918. With the Armistice, further activities were halted and the division disbanded on 29 November 1918 at Camp Meade, Maryland.

=== World War II (deception formation) ===
11th Infantry Division (deception)
- Shoulder Sleeve Insignia of the third 11th Infantry Division. It was made to resemble the face of a clock, with the 11 o'clock position colored black to represent the 11th Division.
- Active: 1944 Operation Fortitude South
- Country: United States
- Branch: United States Army
- Role: Infantry
- Size: Division
- Part of: XXXIII Corps (fictitious)
- Garrison/HQ: Northwich, Cheshire (deception)

The 11th Infantry Division was 'reformed' for a third time in 1944 as part of Operation Fortitude. A purely notional unit, in the deception it was depicted as intended to replace the real 4th Armored Division when the 4th Armored moved to Normandy.

The division was presented to the Germans as a well trained unit based in the area around Northwich, Cheshire with its headquarters located at Delamere House. When the 4th Armored Division moved to Normandy, the 11th Infantry Division was depicted as moving into the vacated quarters around Bury St Edmunds. There, as part of the (notional) US XXXIII Corps of the (notional) US 14th Army it was depicted as assigned the role of following up the Pas de Calais landings. In the aftermath of Fortitude South II the 11th Division was depicted as moving to Winchester in Hampshire during August, 1944. The deception then had the 11th Division moving to Abergavenny in South Wales during October, 1944 when the deception was terminated by announcing that the 11th Division had been disbanded to provide replacements for other units. In the deception the 11th Infantry Division was composed of the notional 178th, 352nd, and 392d Infantry Regiments, in addition to notional artillery and support units.
