= 9th Airborne Division (United States) =

Airborne deception division of the US Army

"9th Airborne Division" deception shoulder sleeve insignia

The 9th Airborne Division of the United States Army was a military deception created in 1944 as part of Fortitude South II

It was initially depicted as being under the direct command of Fourteenth United States Army with its headquarters located in Leicester, Leicestershire in June 1944. In the Pas de Calais landings it and the notional '21st Airborne Division' were to be dropped behind the US XXXVII Corps beachheads. In August 1944 it was notionally transferred to the direct command of First United States Army Group.

In the aftermath of Fortitude South, the notional United States 9th and 21st and British 2nd Airborne Divisions and the real United States 17th Airborne Division were used to depict an airborne threat to the Kiel-Bremen area in support of Operation Market Garden.

In November 1944 it was announced that the division had been merged with the 21st Airborne Division to form the 13th Airborne Division, a real unit that was about to be deployed to France.

== Composition ==
In addition to the usual divisional support units the 9th Airborne Division was notionally composed of:

- 196th Glider Infantry Regiment
- 199th Glider Infantry Regiment
- 523rd Parachute Infantry Regiment
