= 59th Infantry Division (United States) =

- 59th Infantry Division shoulder sleeve insignia
- Active: 1944
- Country: United States
- Branch: United States Army
- Type: Infantry
- Role: Deception (Operation Quicksilver)
- Size: Division

The US 59th Infantry Division was a 'Phantom Division' created in May 1944 as part of Fortitude South II. to cover the deployment of the US 35th Infantry Division to Normandy.

== World War II ==
The division was presented to the Germans as having established its headquarters in the Harwich area after having been formed at Fort Custer in 1942 and undergone training in Tennessee, Minnesota and the Desert Training Center.

In Fortitude South II it formed part of US XXXVII Corps, US 14th Army and was depicted as one of the divisions that would carry out the first landings on the Pas de Calais beaches, landing at the central of the three notional landing beaches. During this period it carried out three simulated landing exercises with the notional Force F.

In the aftermath of Fortitude South II was depicted as moving to Rowlands Castle in Hampshire during August 1944 before leaving the United Kingdom via Southampton in September 1944.

== Insignia ==
Most 'Phantom Division' insignia were designed by the Quartermaster Corps, however in the case of the 59th Infantry Division, its insignia, inspired by the Gadsden flag was created by American members of the Operation Fortitude staff.

In his reports to the Germans, Agent Tate described the insignia as "...a black snake on circular blue ground."

== Composition ==
In addition to the usual divisional support units the 59th Infantry Division was composed of:

- 94th Infantry Regiment
- 139th Infantry Regiment
- 171st Infantry Regiment
