= 48th Armored Division (United States) =

- 48th Armored Division shoulder sleeve insignia
- Active: 1946 - 1955 (48th Infantry Division); 1955 - 1968 (48th Armored Division)
- Country: United States
- Branch: United States Army
- Type: Armor
- Role: Armored warfare
- Size: Division
- Garrison/HQ: Jacksonville, Florida
- Nickname: "Hurricane"

Insignia
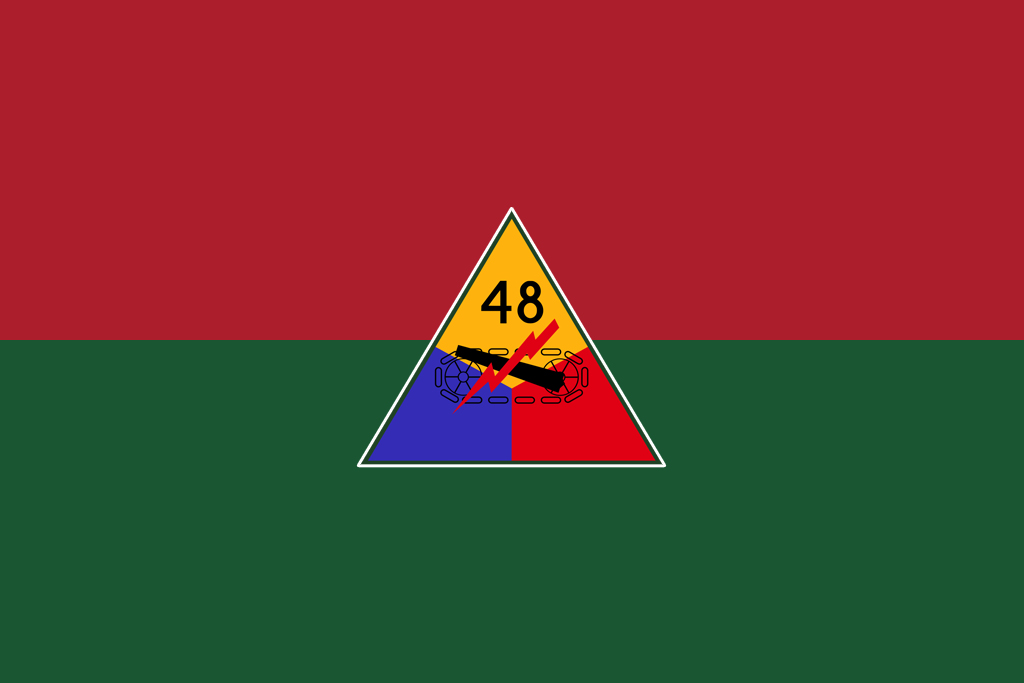
- Flag of the United States Army 48th Armored Division
NATO Map Symbol
48

The 48th Armored Division was a division of the United States Army National Guard from September 1946 until 1968. Most of its units were part of the Florida Army National Guard and the Georgia Army National Guard. From 1946 to 1955 it was an infantry division.

During World War II the designation 48th Infantry Division was used during the military deception plan Operation Quicksilver in advance of the 1944 Normandy landings. It was reported as part of the deception-only XXXIII Corps and given a "Ghost" divisional patch.

== History ==
230th Field Artillery Battalion inactivated 20 November 1945 at Fort Jackson, South Carolina. Relieved 5 July 1946 from assignment to the 30th Infantry Division and assigned to the 48th Infantry Division.

The 48th "Hurricane" Infantry Division was formed on 15 September 1946 by Florida and Georgia National Guardsmen. The division conducted its first annual training from 18 July to 1 August 1948 at Fort Jackson.

Elements of the 48th Armored Division, circa 1960, probably the 124th Infantry of Florida.

Shoulder patch used by the National Guard 48th Infantry Division from 16 February 1949 to 1 November 1955.

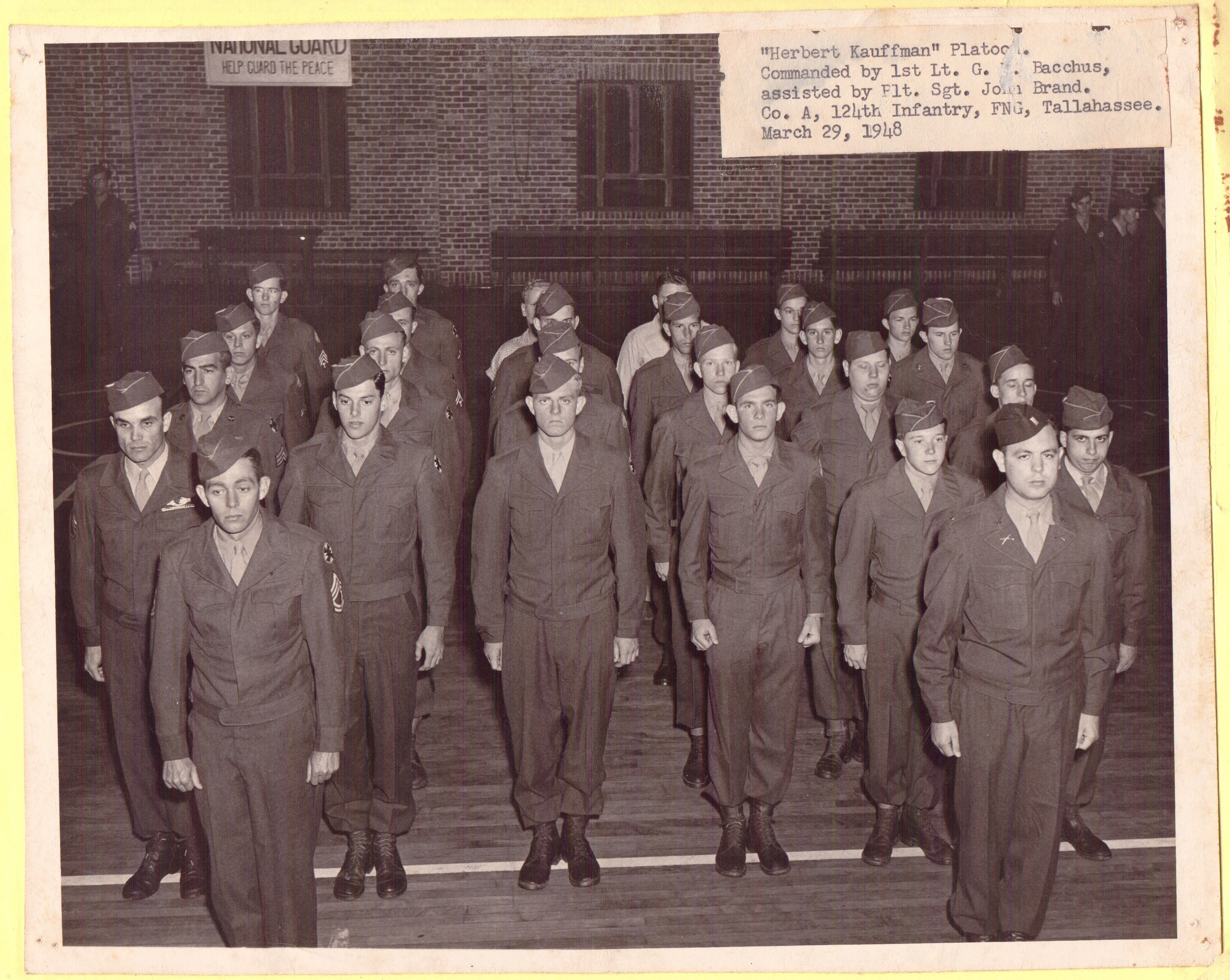
A platoon from Co A, 124th Infantry, 48th Infantry Division, Florida National Guard circa 29 March 1948. Note the use of the "Ghost Division" patch. For a short time, circa 1948, at least part of the National Guard 48th Infantry Division used this patch before a new patch (the red and white star) was designed.

In 1952, "[t]o prepare for challenges in Western Europe, the new troop basis authorized the conversion of four National Guard infantry divisions to armored divisions." Georgia and Florida agreed to convert the 48th Infantry Division to armor.

On 1 November 1955, the division was reorganized as the 48th Armored Division. The 118th FAB at Savannah (reformed 1947) was reorganized and redesignated 1 November 1955 as the 118th Armored Field Artillery Battalion and assigned to the new 48th Armored Division. The same day, the 230th FAB, also at Savannah, also reformed 1947, also was reorganized and redesignated, as the 230th Armored Field Artillery Battalion, an element of the 48th Armored Division.

The 118th and 230th Armored Field Artillery Battalions were consolidated 1 July 1959 to form the 118th Artillery, a parent regiment under the Combat Arms Regimental System, to consist of the 1st and 2d Howitzer Battalions, elements of the 48th Armored Division. Reorganized 16 April 1963 to consist of the 1st, 2d, and 3d Battalions, elements of the 48th Armored Division.

Unit	Headquartered	Commander
Division Headquarters	Jacksonville, Florida	
124th Infantry Regiment	Jacksonville, Florida	Col. Maxwell C. Snyder
121st Infantry Regiment	Georgia	
149th Field Artillery Battalion	Lakeland, Florida	Lt. Col. Milton E. Hull

The 124th Infantry Regiment of the Florida ARNG was assigned on 5 July 1946 to the 48th Infantry Division. It was broken up on 1 November 1955 and its elements, the 124th Armored Infantry Battalion and the 154th Armored Infantry Battalion were both assigned to the 48th Armored Division. The 124th and 154th Armored Infantry Battalions were consolidated 15 April 1959 to form the 124th Infantry, a parent regiment under the Combat Arms Regimental System, to consist of the 1st and 2d Armored Rifle Battalions, elements of the 48th Armored Division.

On 1 October 1957 the 48th Armored Division headquarters was transferred from Macon, Georgia, to Jacksonville, Florida, as Major General Maxwell Snyder took command.

As a result of the changeover from an infantry division to an armoured division, the Tank Company of the 124th Infantry Regiment at Lake City was converted and redesignated on 1 November 1955 as Headquarters and Service Company, 187th Tank Battalion. In April 1959, the company became Headquarters Company (less battalion medical section), 1st Medium Tank Battalion, 187th Armor. It was reorganized and redesignated 15 February 1963 as Headquarters Company, 1st Battalion, 187th Armor; concurrently relieved from assignment to the 48th Armored Division and assigned to the 53d Separate Infantry Brigade.

On 15 April 1959, the Anti-Tank

When the 51st Infantry Division was inactivated in 1963, some of its units, both from Florida and South Carolina, were assigned to the 48th Armoured Division. After the 51st Division was inactivated, the 53rd Infantry Brigade was reorganized and redesignated 1 March 1964 as the 53d Armored Brigade.

When the Army National Guard next reorganized in 1967, the 48th Armoured Division was chosen for inactivation, which occurred on 1 January 1968.

Soldiers and units in Florida were assigned to the 53d Infantry Brigade, which reformed from the 53rd Armoured Brigade on 20 January 1968. The 53rd Infantry Brigade became a Infantry Brigade Combat Team in the 21st century. The number "48" was carried on by the Georgia National Guard and is today the 48th Infantry Brigade Combat Team.

== Commanders ==
- Maj. Gen. Henry D. Russell, Georgia National Guard (3 July 1946 - 6 February 1951)
- Maj. Gen. Joseph C. Hutchinson, Florida National Guard (7 February 1951 – 29 February 1952)
- Maj. Gen. Joseph B. Fraser, Georgia Army National Guard (1 March 1952 - 1 August 1955)
- Maj. Gen. Patrick E. Seawright, Georgia Army National Guard (1 August 1955 – 1 October 1957)
- Maj. Gen. Maxwell C. Snyder, Florida Army National Guard (1 October 1957 - July 1962)
- Maj. Gen. Benjamin Merritt, Georgia Army National Guard (July 1962 - )

== See also ==
- United States Army deception formations of World War II
