= List of British deception formations in World War II =

Fictional British units during WW2

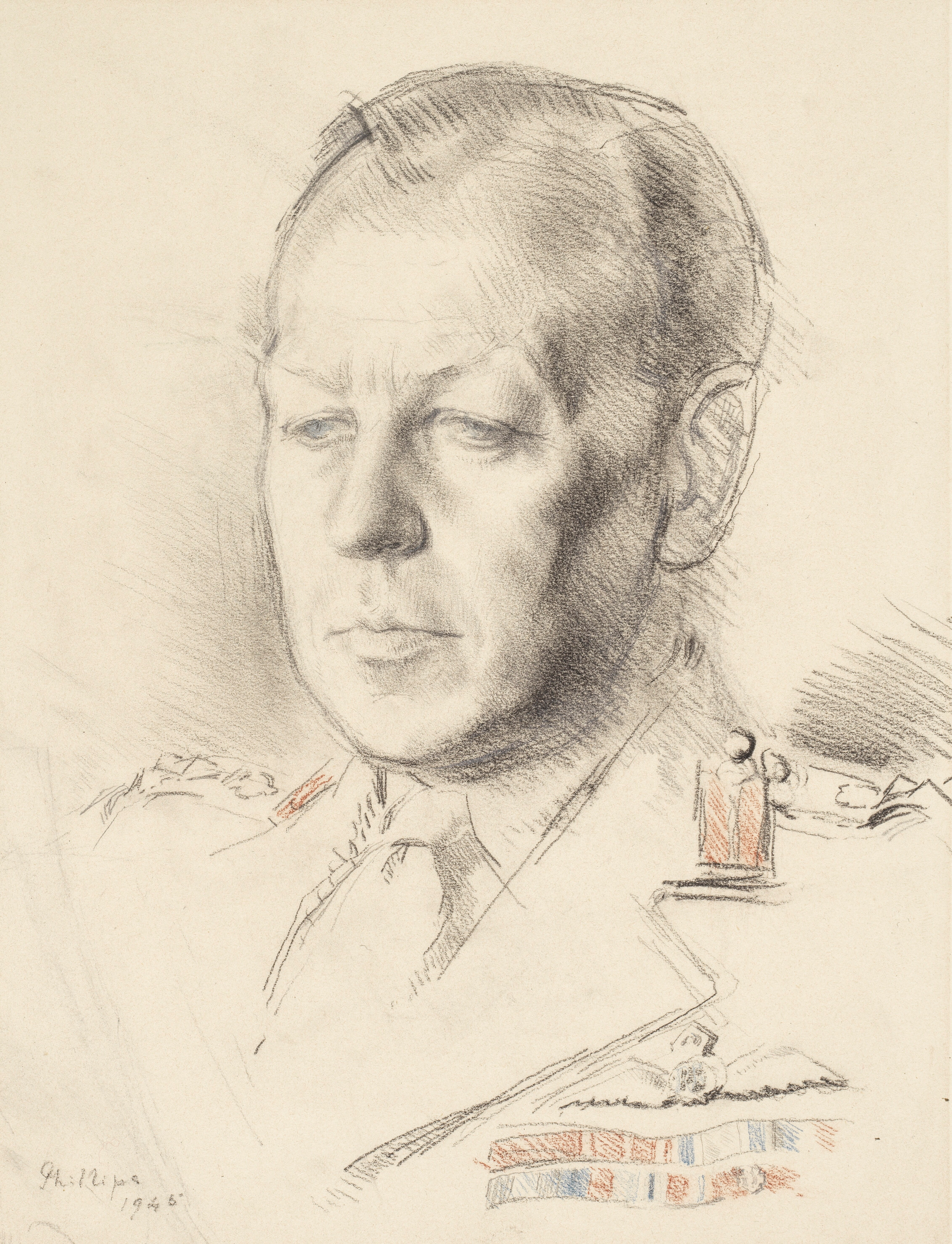
A portrait of Brigadier Dudley Clarke, who has been described as being "ultimately responsible for the greatest military deceptions in history".

During the Second World War, the British Army made extensive use of fictional formations as part of various military deception efforts to inflate their order of battle. The use of such formations was pioneered by Lieutenant-Colonel Dudley Clarke, based within the Mediterranean and Middle East theatre, and later joined by colleagues located in the UK. The initial efforts were small and created a fictional brigade with no long-term goal. As the war progressed, the deception efforts escalated into elaborate plans that included entire notional armies. In total, 36 notional divisions were created although they were not all employed at the same time. Some of these were based on real units that had previously been disbanded.

Clarke's initial order-of-battle deception created the 1st Special Air Service Brigade. This notional formation was aimed to take advantage of Axis fears of British paratrooper forces being based in Egypt, from where they could potentially land behind the front line. It was followed by two separate efforts that created fictitious divisions to hide various weakness of the British forces in the theatre. In 1942, these efforts grew into Operation Cascade, which again sought to hide the weakness of British forces and deter potential Axis aggression.

In 1943, planning began for the Allied reconquest of German-occupied Western Europe. A major deception effort, Operation Bodyguard, was implemented and included forces based within the UK and the Mediterranean. Allied staff based in the UK worked on Operation Fortitude, which aimed to create new fake formations and an entire notional order of battle. The goal of these efforts was to lead the German military into believing substantial forces could attack Norway, and that Normandy landings were a ruse to hide the real attack that would be launched elsewhere by notional forces based in the UK. Within the Mediterranean theatre, Operation Zeppelin was Fortitude's counterpart. It aimed to elaborate on the work undertaken by Operation Cascade and use the notional formations to feign the threat of attacks throughout the Mediterranean area. The fake order of battle was also used to conceal troop movements from the Mediterranean to the UK. While fake divisions were created to supplement Allied forces in British India and Burma, there was no theatre-wide deception effort.

These various deception operations undertook administrative and physical efforts to fool Axis forces into believing these formations existed. This included fake insignia and documents, inflatable tanks, wireless communications, and the deliberate leaking of information, especially via double agents. Within Europe, these efforts convinced the German military that the Allied powers had more divisions than they did. However, similar efforts in Asia were met with mixed success.

== Background ==
=== Initial efforts ===
Lieutenant-Colonel Dudley Clarke, who had previously been engaged in various intelligence work and had helped form the Commandos, was assigned to Middle East Command on 19 December 1940. His role was the Personal Intelligence Officer (Special Duties) to Middle East Command's commander-in-chief, General Archibald Wavell. After assisting with Operation Camilla, the deception plan for the reoccupation of British Somaliland, Clarke undertook his first effort to create an entirely fictitious formation.

Operation Abeam was the codename given for the creation of the fictional 1st Special Air Service Brigade. This brigade was placed to notionally support Wavell's attack against Italian forces in the Western Desert campaign, by playing on the Italian concern of potential British airborne forces being in the theatre and that they could be used to land behind the frontline. This was followed by a scaled-up version, in efforts to fool Italian intelligence into believing that a notional 10th Armoured Division was arriving piecemeal in Egypt, where British forces were based. The plan aimed to cover the lack of British armoured forces actually located there.

The first use of deception formations within combat plans came shortly thereafter, in March 1941, when Wavell planned to seize the island of Rhodes. A deception plan was formed to suggest the real target was Scarpanto and that the 1st Special Air Service Brigade would raid Rhodes to distract Axis forces. Due to German reinforcements arriving in Africa, to bolster the Italians, the attack did not occur. On 28 March, Clarke's team became known as Advanced Headquarters 'A' Force, with the 'A' purposely left ambiguous.

Abeam and the 10th Armoured Division had been intended only for short-term use, the first long-term plan was formed in June. Cyprus was potentially at risk of invasion, following the German occupation of Crete. The Cyprus Defense Plan aimed to deter any attack and to buy time to allow actual reinforcements to arrive to bolster the 4,000-man garrison. The deception plan claimed that the garrison was at least 20,000 strong, based around the fictitious 7th Infantry Division (Cyprus). The plan evolved to include additional units, a changing order of battle for the 7th Division, and a notional corps headquarters. These successes prompted the creation of the London Controlling Section, a similar unit to 'A' Force but based in the UK.

=== Expansion ===
The lessons learnt during these early order-of-battle deceptions, along with other deception operations undertaken by A Force, resulted in Operation Cascade. The initial objective, outlined in March 1942, was to deter a potential German assault via the Caucasus – if the Germans succeeded in their southern spring offensive inside the Soviet Union – by inflating the British order of battle within the Middle East. The plan called for eight new notional divisions as well as two notional armoured brigades, in addition to the existing notional 1st Special Service Brigade (the actual British strength during this period was 15 divisions). The plan officially began in July and carried on through to 1944, evolving as the situation required and with additional formations added. For example, in March 1943, six further notional British divisions were added.

During 1943, the Allies began planning for a major offensive that aimed to liberate German-occupied France. The planning of this included a deception element that was codenamed Operation Bodyguard. Bodyguard, in turn, consisted of various elements. For the Mediterranean area, the overall deception plan was Operation Zeppelin that aimed to create an Allied threat to various Axis-held territories. To support this, the Allied order of battle needed to be inflated to provide these operations with the necessary forces to create such threats. As a result, Cascade was superseded by Operation Wantage on 6 February 1944. Specifically, Wantage aimed to increase the forces in the Mediterranean by 33 per cent, and double the number of forces based within the Middle East (the latter included the creation of eighteen new notional divisions, six corps, and one army). The efforts conducted by Cascade and Wantage allowed for Operation Foynes, which aimed to conceal the withdrawal of Allied formations from Italy. Eight divisions were withdrawn to the UK, to provide the forming Allied armies with a core of veteran forces for the assault on France. These formations were replaced by three real and four fake divisions. The northern Europe counterpart to Zeppelin was initially codenamed Operation Torrent and then referred to as Appendix Y, based on the section name of the planning documents. This plan then evolved into Operation Mespot and subsequently Operation Fortitude. It was planned by a department called Ops (B) and split into two: Fortitude North, which sought to create a threat towards Scandinavia; and Fortitude South that aimed to make the Germans believe that the invasion of France would take place in the Pas-de-Calais region. These plans aimed to expand the Allied order of battle within the UK in order to provide the forces required to maintain these threats.

=== Method ===
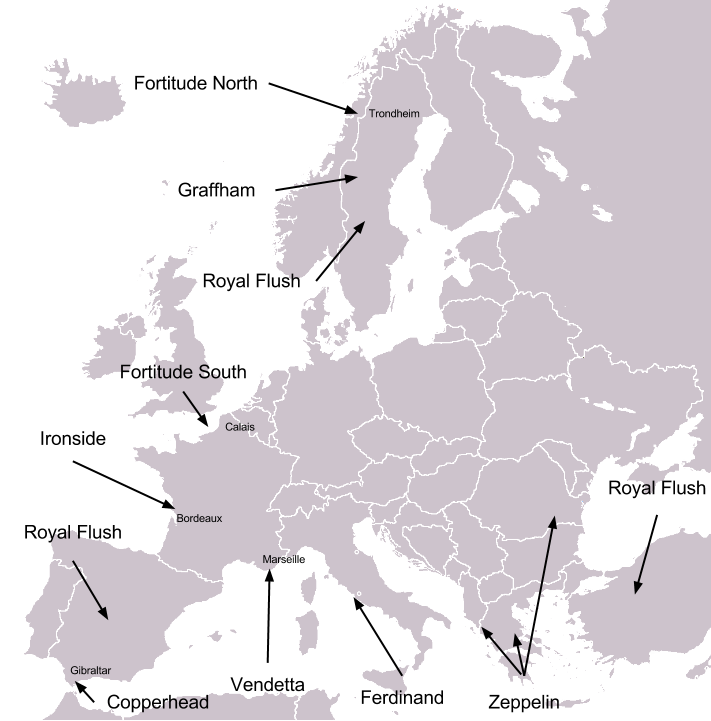
Map depicting the targets of all the subordinate plans of Bodyguard

Deception formations was not limited to British forces. Notional American, British Indian, Canadian, French, Greek, New Zealand, and South African formations were also fabricated. (Note: For example, the New Zealand contribution to Cascade included redesignating one of their military bases in Egypt as the Sixth New Zealand Division in May 1942. To further the deception, elements of the camp took on the role of larger formations, such as the training depot being renamed the 9th Infantry Brigade. In June 1942, the real New Zealand Division was renamed the 2nd New Zealand Division.) To create and maintain the illusion of these notional formations, various methods were undertaken. At a basic level, British intelligence purposely leaked information and started rumors that would eventually reach Axis intelligence services. This included planting information to be found by foreign diplomats. The notional formations were given insignia and efforts were made to include them on official documents that contained real formations. It was reasoned that the documentation would help to create a general belief that these fake formations existed, and if captured they would further aid the deception. Insignia was worn by soldiers and painted on vehicles. These were then publicly displayed for willing or unwitting Axis informants. Passes and identity cards were manufactured and then "lost" where they could find their way into Axis hands. Dummy tanks covered in tarpaulins were routed through populated areas, and dummy parachutists were dropped near Cairo to simulate parachute training. Wireless traffic was created for the fictional formations. For the benefit of Axis aerial reconnaissance, dummy tanks, fake tank tracks, and fake camps were constructed and moved around to create the fictitious presence of additional armoured formations. Furthermore, MI5, the British security service, had eliminated the German spy ring within the UK. Thereafter, they operated a series of double agents known as the Double-Cross System. These double agents were used to feed German military intelligence information about real and fake formations, their insignia, movements, and provided entire fictitious orders of battle. Due to Ultra, the breaking of German encrypted communications, the British were able to read German coded messages and verify the success of their efforts.

The notional arrival of Canadian troops in Egypt, as part of the deception effort to increase the British-led presence in the area, provides a case example. Canadian insignias were displayed in various locations in Egypt and within the Mandate of Palestine. In Palestine, British intelligence created an influx of Canadian dollars at various money exchanges, and also requested that Vichy French (pro-Axis) forces in the Middle East remain on the look-out and return (notional) French-Canadian deserters. The success of the Cyprus deception effort was verified via intercepted German communications about the level of British forces on the island. By May 1942, the deception methods had resulted in Axis intelligence overestimating British forces in Africa and the Middle East by 30 per cent. This included three of the notional divisions being verified on the German order of battle of British forces. In November 1942, following the Second Battle of El Alamein, the British military captured numerous German intelligence documents. A Force reviewed these documents and were able to verify an initial success to Operation Cascade, with reference being made to many of their notional units. This had resulted in the Germans overestimating the British armoured strength by 45 per cent and their infantry strength by 40 per cent. Dummy tank formations were repeatedly bombed by the Axis air forces. By 1944, there were 44 real Allied divisions in the Mediterranean area. Due to Cascade and Wantage, German intelligence believed there was in fact around 70.

=== Impact ===
Roger Fleetwood-Hesketh, who played a major role in the planning of Fortitude, wrote that captured German maps verified the success of the north and south portions of the deception plan. These maps depicted the location of Allied formations within the UK, the fake order of battles, and notional formations. Mary Barbier, a historian who wrote about the Fortitude deception plan, has questioned its success. She wrote "it is time to consider that the importance of the deception has been overrated", and argued that the plan worked as the Germans held "preconceived ideas about the importance of the Pas De Calais", and that the Allied staff had overestimated the effectiveness of the deception as they held a "preconceived notion of what Fortitude would accomplish". Alfred Jodl, a German general, told interrogators after the end of the war, that major landings were expected in southern France due to the large concentration of forces that the Germans believed had been built-up in Africa. Thaddeus Holt, who wrote about the Allied deception methods, wrote that it was "particularly gratifying ... the puzzlement expressed by one German general" who asked why the notional 5th Airborne Division (United Kingdom) had not been used in the Allied Spring 1945 offensive in Italy.

Similar deceptions were conducted in Asia. However, efforts to operate Bodyguard-like deception were thwarted by the lack of a defined Allied strategy as the British, Americans, and Chinese all held different agendas and goals. Changing objectives also hindered the development of any strategic deception plan to dupe the Empire of Japan. In June 1944, the British captured Japanese documents dated from November 1943, which indicated that the Japanese believed that there were 51 1/2 Allied divisions in Southeast Asia and British India, when the actual strength was around 13. Despite the belief in the deception efforts that had created the inflated order of battle, the attempt to use these formations to influence Japanese planning and actions had little impact.

== Armies ==
List of armies
| Formation name | Date created | Date ceased to exist | Insignia | Deception plan | Notes | Ref |
|---|---|---|---|---|---|---|
| Third Army | N/A | N/A | N/A | N/A | German intelligence were aware of the British Army's regional commands from before the war. Due to various Allied deception efforts, German intelligence had over-estimated the number of Allied forces based within the UK by the start of 1944. While there was no specific deception effort to create the Third Army, German intelligence believed that one had been formed from Northern Command. | |
| Fourth Army | Jun 1943; Mar 1944 | Nov 1943; Feb 1945 | rectangular badge with gold lion on red field with black horizontal stripe | Tindall, Fortitude North, Fortitude South II, Trolleycar | Scottish Command created and maintained the ruse of the Fourth Army, with the lion of their own insignia replaced by medieval style number four. The army was initially composed of the notional XXI Corps. The army threaten an Allied invasion of German-occupied Norway in 1943 as part of Operation Tindall, and again in 1944 as part of Fortitude North. For this second effort, the army comprised real formations and the notional II and VII Corps. In July 1944, the formation joined the deceptive First United States Army Group (FUSAG) for Fortitude South II. In September 1944, the army was used to threaten the Kiel–Bremen area, to divert German attention away from Operation Market Garden. By November, the army included the notional XIX Airborne Corps. By the end of the year, it was notionally based in Yorkshire, to threaten a landing along the Dutch coast (Trolleycar). In early 1945, German intelligence was informed that the army had been used as a source of reinforcements and was then merged with Northern Command. | |
| Fifth Army | N/A | N/A | N/A | N/A | As with the Third Army, there was no specific deception effort to create the Fifth Army, but German intelligence believed that one had been formed from Eastern Command. | |
| Sixth Army | 1943 | 1945 | N/A | Cockade | Formed by Eastern Command to pose a threat to any coast of northeastern Europe, it was not actively employed after 1943. German intelligence maintained it on the British order of battle until the end of the war, and believed it to be based around Luton. | |
| Ninth Army | Oct 1941 | Aug 1945 | Small fort atop a charging elephant, red within a black circle | Rayon, Zeppelin, Ferdinand | The Ninth Army was an actual formation that administered British forces in the Middle East. Various deception operations were used to inflate its size to that of a fighting army, which posed a threat towards the Balkans. | |
| Twelfth Army | May 1943 | May 1945 | A seal balancing a globe on its nose, which showed the eastern hemisphere. Designed by Noel Wild. | Cascade, Barclay, Zeppelin, Ferdinand, Fang, Dante | Initially created as a formation based in Egypt and Palestine, it contained the notional III, XVI, and XIV Corps in addition to the notional III Polish Corps. The army was used to pose a threat towards Crete and southern Greece, in an effort to divert Axis attention away from Italy and the pending Allied invasion of Sicily (Operation Husky). By early 1944, the army had notionally been reinforced by a division of Greek soldiers and maintained the threat towards Greece. Exploiting the mutinies within exiled Greek forces, the army was reassigned around May 1944 to threaten the Italian Province of Pola. The army was then notionally transferred to British India, where it was composed of the imaginary XX and XXXVIII Indian Corps, and was used to threaten an Allied invasion of Sumatra during 1945. This deception was dropped when an actual Twelfth Army was activated. | |

== Corps ==
List of corps
| Formation name | Date created | Date ceased to exist | Insignia | Deception plan | Notes | Ref |
|---|---|---|---|---|---|---|
| II Corps | Mar 1944 | Dec 1944 | red fish on alternating blue and white wavy horizontal stripes | Fortitude North, Skye, Tweezer, Fortitude South II, Imperil, Trolleycar II | While the actual II Corps was disbanded, it was maintained on the order of battle and comprised a number of notional and actual divisions and brigades. As part of the fictional Fourth Army, it was used to threaten Norway (Fortitude North and Skye) with a notional planned landing at Stavanger to advance and capture Oslo. In June 1944, the corps moved to England (Tweezer) and was reinforced by the notional 2nd Airborne Division to threaten a landing in the Pas de Calais (Fortitude South II). In October, the corps was notionally transferred to Belgium to reinforce the real 21st Army Group (Imperil). In November, it was attached to the First Canadian Army in its final deception to threaten an attack west of Arnhem (Trolleycar II). | |
| III Corps | May 1943 | Aug 1944 | five-lobed leaf | Cascade, Undercut, Boardman, Fairlands | Maintained on the order of battle after the actual III Corps had been disbanded, the formation was used as part of the notional Twelfth Army to project a threat towards Italy (Boardman), as a potential invasion force of Greece (Undercut), and to threaten an Allied landing on Corfu (Fairlands). The actual corps was reformed in the Middle East and dispatched to reoccupy Greece following a German withdrawal. | |
| VII Corps | Apr 1944 | Jan 1945 | Scallop shell on a blue background | Fortitude North, Skye, Fortitude South II | This designation had been unused since 1940, when an actual VII Corps was renamed, and was revived for a notional formation to bolster the fictitious Fourth Army. It notionally consisted of the real 52nd (Lowland) Infantry Division and a Norwegian infantry brigade, as well as the fictional US 55th Division and three imaginary US Ranger battalions. While based in Scotland, the corps was used to threaten an invasion of Norway (Fortitude North and Skye). It was later reformed in England with command of the real 61st Infantry Division and the notional 80th Infantry and the 5th Armoured Divisions, and was used to threaten an invasion of the Pas de Calais region (Fortitude South II). By September 1944, the 61st had been replaced by the notional 58th Division. German intelligence were informed that the corps and its formations were drained of manpower to replace casualties suffered by the 21st Army Group in Belgium, and it was disbanded in January 1945. | |
| XIV Corps | Dec 1943 | End of the war | A black wolf's head on a white field | Cascade, Oakfield, Zeppelin, Snowshoe II, Playmate, Compass, Wantage | Various legitimate administration units across Algeria and Tunisia posed as this corps, which was composed completely of notional formations. The deception included Christmas party invitations for the corps' officers being leaked to Axis agents in Spain and Turkey. Over winter 1943–44, the corps was used to threaten the Tuscany area of Italy (Oakfield), in an attempt to protect and support the Anzio landing. In early 1944, the corps was notionally reinforced with paratroopers and moved to Sicily, then to the western end of the Mediterranean by May. During winter 1944–45, the corps notionally moved to Terni, Italy. Its insignia was adopted by a mountain warfare training facility in the area, and the corps took on the role of the 15th Army Group's reserve that was being trained in mountain warfare so as to appear ready to fight in the Alps. | |
| XVI Corps | Nov 1943 | Unknown | Phoenix bearing a torch, emerging from red flames on a white field | Fairlands | The notional corps was activated in Egypt, composed entirely of fictional divisions (the 8th Armoured, the 15th Motorised, and the 34th Infantry Divisions), and was assigned to the imaginary Twelfth Army. The corps was used to threaten an invasion of several of the Greek Ionian Islands (Fairlands). | |
| XVII Corps | Nov 1944 | Nov 1944 | N/A | N/A | The notional corps was created to command the real 55th and the 61st Infantry Divisions, when the fake II Corps was notionally transferred to Belgium. However, outside of planning documents, the corps was never referred to and its existence was not provided to the Germans via any deception method. Instead, the decision was made to leak the actual transfer of these two divisions to central control of the War Office. | |
| XVIII Corps | Jun 1941 | Jun 1941 | Unknown | Cyprus Defense Plan | The British military initially saw Cyprus as a low-priority area and did not want to bolster its small garrison. In June 1941, following the Battle of Crete, efforts were made to reinforce the island. This included the activation of the notional XVIII Corps. It is not known if it had any insignia created, and was shortly thereafter renamed XXV Corps. | |
| XIX Airborne Corps | Oct 1944 | Dec 1944 | light blue Pegasus and rider on purple background | N/A | This notional corps was assigned to the First Allied Airborne Army and composed of the factual 6th Airborne and the fake 2nd Airborne Division. In December, the corps was disbanded, and it was leaked to Germany that it had only been an administrative formation and was not referenced again beyond January 1945. | |
| XXI Corps | 1943 | 1943 | N/A | Tindall | The corps formed part of the initial notional Fourth Army, which was created to pose a threat to Norway. When the Fourth Army was revived for Fortitude North, the corps was not used. | |
| XXV Corps | Jun 1941 | Unknown | A red lion passant gardant on a yellow field, based on the insignia of British HQ Cyprus | Cyprus Defense Plan 1941, Cascade, Wantage | Originally the notional XVIII Corps prior to being renamed, it was created to control the notional 7th Division (Cyprus) and the real 50th (Northumbrian) Infantry Division. After the 50th Division left, the corps reverted to an order of battle of only notional divisions, which also included the 1st Indian Infantry Division. | |
| XXVI Airborne Corps | Nov 1944 | End of the war | A depiction of the god Mercury | Tarzan, Claw, Sceptical, Slippery | The notional corps consisted of the real 9th Indian Airborne, and the fake 10th African Airborne, the 32nd Air Transit Divisions, and the 89th Armoured Brigade Group. It later included the fictitious 3rd Airborne Division. The corps was notionally based in Bengal, and was initially used to threaten a landing behind the Japanese frontline to hinder their retreat through Burma (Tarzan) following a successful British offensive. The corps was then used to threaten a landing near Moulmein, Burma, which would cut off any Japanese retreat from Rangoon and isolate the port (Claw). In June 1945, the corps reinforced the real Twelfth Army, and was then used to project a threat towards Thailand. The corps was notionally to land and assault Bangkok in November 1945, as part of an Allied assault on the country (Sceptical and Slippery). | |

== Divisions ==
List of divisions
| Formation name | Date created | Date ceased to exist | Insignia | Deception plan | Notes | Ref |
|---|---|---|---|---|---|---|
| 2nd Airborne Division | Jun 1944 | Dec 1944 | light blue Pegasus and rider on purple background | Bodyguard, Fortitude South II | The formation was created in June 1944 to bolster the Fortitude South II deception effort, and consisted of the notional 11th and 12th Parachute and the 13th Airlanding Brigades. It used the same insignia as the real British airborne formations. While the formation's existence was leaked to the Germans in June as being stationed in England, German intelligence already believed the formation existed and had been located in the western Mediterranean area. As part of Fortitude South II, the division would notionally land on the right flank of an invasion conducted by the First United States Army Group (FUSAG) in the Pas-de-Calais area of France. In September, as the final efforts of Operation Bodyguard and to support Operation Market Garden, FUSAG and the division were used to present a threat to the Kiel–Bremen area. At the end of the year, the division was notionally disbanded with a cover story provided that its forces were used to reinforce the real 1st and 6th Airborne Divisions. | |
| 3rd Airborne Division | Unknown | End of the war | A white winged scimitar | Fortitude South II, Conclave, Tarzan, Claw | The formation was initially part of the FUSAG order of battle, used to pose a threat to the Pas-de-Calais area of France (Fortitude South II). By the end of 1944, the division was notionally based in British India and part of the equally fake XXVI Airborne Corps. It was used to pose a threat to retreating Japanese forces in Burma (Conclave and Tarzan), before being used to pose the threat of an Allied invasion of Sumatra (Claw). | |
| 4th Airborne Division | Jan 1943 | Unknown | An open white parachute with black wings on a blue field | Cascade, Barclay, Zeppelin | The notional division was formed in Egypt, and based upon the actual 4th Parachute Brigade. In April 1943, the 4th Brigade departed and was replaced by the notional 6th (Gurkha) Parachute Brigade (which consisted of the notional 6th Battalion, 6th Gurkha Rifles, the 160th (Gurkha) and the 161st (Gurkha) Parachute Battalions), the 1st Special Air Service Brigade, and the 7th Parachute Brigades (which notionally contained Greek and French paratroopers). The division was then notionally based in Palestine. In 1943, it was used to threaten an Allied invasion of Greece (Barclay). During 1944, it notionally moved to Cyrenaica, British-occupied Italian Libya, as part of the notional Twelfth Army, and was used to threaten an attack upon German-occupied Greece (Zeppelin). | |
| 5th Airborne Division | 1943 | End of the war | Light blue lightning bolt on a dark red field; replaced by the Pegasus badge in 1945. | Foynes, Ferdinand, Second Undercut | The division was notionally created at the end of 1943 and comprised the 8th Parachute (8th Battalion, Highland Light infantry; 8th Battalion, Cameronians (Scottish Rifles); 12th Battalion, Black Watch) and the 9th Airlanding Brigade (4th Battalion, Rifle Brigade; 5th Battalion, Royal Ulster Rifles; 15th Battalion, King's Royal Rifle Corps). Using the genuine 2nd Parachute Brigade for a physical presence, the notional division covered the withdrawal of the 1st Airborne Division from Italy and its redeployment back to the United Kingdom (Foynes). By May 1944, the division was notionally based in the western Mediterranean, and was used to project the threat of an invasion of an undetermined target in the Adriatic and Balkan region (Ferdinand). Later in the year, it was notionally based in Sicily with the intent of a landing in Greece (Second Undercut). By December 1944, the division was notionally a theatre-wide reserve formation, which could be used to strike any target of opportunity that was within range. During 1945, German intelligence efforts attempted to pinpoint the exact location of the division. Feigning security reasons, the division was notionally dispersed. The 9th Airlanding Brigade was sent to Malta to train and await reinforcements, while the 8th Parachute Brigade and the divisional headquarters were relocated to Rome. In Rome, the division was again physically depicted by the 2nd Parachute Brigade. | |
| 5th Armoured Division | Jun 1944 | Jan 1945 | A blue lobster | Fortitude South II | The division was created to form part of the VII Corps, after the corps had notionally moved from Scotland to England without any subordinate formations. The division consisted of the notional 37th Armoured and briefly the actual 43rd Infantry Brigades (which was disbanded in Sicily at the end of June 1944 after masquerading as the 40th Infantry Division). The Germans were informed that the division was located at Newmarket, Suffolk, whereas its corps headquarters was based in Kent. In August, this prompted questions from German intelligence, who were informed that the terrain in Suffolk was conductive to armoured warfare training and that it was not unusual for formations to be separated from their corps headquarters for this purpose. By November, the division had notionally moved to Yorkshire. Over the coming months, the Germans were informed that due to the high casualties suffered by the 21st Army Group in Belgium and the Netherlands, that the division had been used as a source of reinforcements, resulting in it being disbanded. | |
| 7th Division (Cyprus) | Jun 1941 | Unknown (Note: H. F. Joslen, who compiled the official history on the British order of battle during the war, stated that the deception formation was dropped in June 1943. Thaddeus Holt, who wrote about the wartime deception formations, stated that the formation was still in existence as late as May 1944, but did not provide a date for when it was removed from the order of battle.) | Black cat on a white field | Cyprus Defense Plan, Cascade | A divisional headquarters was formed on 14 June 1941, to deter any German attack on Cyprus, and was given command of all existing forces on the island. The division notionally controlled the imaginary 21st, the real 22nd Guards (fighting in the Western Desert campaign), and the real 23rd Infantry Brigades (engaged in the Syria–Lebanon campaign). After the island was reinforced, the actual divisional HQ was disbanded on 23 August 1941 but maintained for deception purposes. Starting in March 1942, the division controlled the notional Northern and Southern brigades as well as the 14th Indian Infantry Brigade. In May 1943, the division was renamed the 7th Mixed Division after it was amalgamated with the notional 1st Indian Division, and composed the 2nd and 41st Indian Brigades along with the 1st Cyprus Brigade. | |
| 8th Division (Syria) | Mar 1942 | Oct 1943 | Crossed battleaxes | Cascade | The real 8th Infantry Division had been disbanded in 1940, and the division was notionally revived on 2 June 1942 as part of Operation Cascade. The division was portrayed by the 5th Cavalry Brigade and the various administrative units that it controlled, and provided internal security within Syria for the Ninth Army. The division did not use the insignia of the real 8th Infantry, and was provided with a sign of crossed battleaxes. The division notionally controlled the bogus 18th, 19th, and 40th Infantry Brigades and inflated the order of battle of the Ninth Army. It was disbanded on 31 October 1943. | |
| 8th Armoured Division | Mar 1943 | Unknown | letters GO in green circle within black square | Cascade, Waterfall, Boardman, Fairlands, Zeppelin | After the actual division was broken-up in January 1943, it was revived in March 1943 for deception purposes and maintained the original insignia. The division was simulated by a dummy tank brigade (Waterfall), and maintained the illusion of a build-up of armoured forces in the province of Cyrenaica, British-occupied Italian Libya. The division was used to pose a threat towards Greece through to 1944. For the major 1944 deception plan (Zeppelin), the division was assigned to the notional XVI Corps of the equally fake Twelfth Army. | |
| 9th Armoured Division | Aug 1944 | End of the war | Giant panda head | Appendix Y | This real formation had been formed in 1940 and had served solely within the United Kingdom. In 1943, it was allotted to be used within Appendix Y, the initial deception plan for the Allied invasion of German-occupied France, but its role was not incorporated as the deception plan evolved. In early 1944, the division's personnel aided in the portrayal of the notional Fourth Army. The actual division was disbanded at the end of July 1944 and the formation was notionally assigned to the 21st Army Group, but not used in any particular plan. | |
| 10th African Airborne Division | Unknown | Unknown | African Buffalo head | Unknown | The notional division was assigned to the XVI Airborne Corps, but no information is known about what it was notionally composed of. In 1945, it was purportedly based in the Chittagong area of British India. | |
| 10th Armoured Division | Jan 1941 | Jul 1941 | N/A | 10th Armoured Division Plan | Designed to cover the lack of armoured forces and scheduled reinforcements in the Middle East, this notional division was represented by a British Indian Army motorised infantry brigade that had arrived in Egypt. The division was notionally to move into Italian Libya, to threaten the flank of any Axis advance. In March 1941, the real 2nd Armoured Division moved into Italian Libya and actually assumed this role. A genuine 10th Armoured Division was formed, in Palestine, on 1 August 1941. | |
| 12th Division (SDF) | Jul 1942 | Jan 1945 | white diamond in brown rectangle | Cascade | On 11 July 1942, the 1st Sudan Defence Force Brigade was redesignated as the 12th Division (SDF). (Note: H. F. Joslen, who compiled the official history on the British order of battle during the war, stated that the division was called the 12th Division (SDF). Thaddeus Holt, who wrote about the British deception formations, stated that the division was called the 12th Mixed Division.) The division was assigned the insignia of the 12th (Eastern) Infantry Division, which had been disbanded in July 1940. The Sudan Defence Force (SDF) provided a security force on the lines of communication behind the Eighth Army in North Africa. After the Allied victory in North Africa, it was based in the Tripoli area of Italian Libya. The notional SDF division controlled the real 2nd SDF Brigade (based in Sudan) and a notional 182nd Infantry Brigade. In May 1944, the order of battle was changed with the latter brigade being replaced by the notional 38th Indian Infantry Brigade. The division was disbanded on 12 January 1945, when the formation was redesignated the Sudan Defence Force Group (North Africa). | |
| 13th (East African) Division | Mar 1942 | End of the war | African Buffalo head | Fang | The real 21st (East Africa) Infantry Brigade was dispatched to garrison Ceylon in March 1942 and posed as the notional 13th (East African) Division. No information is known about the composition of the notional division, which remained in Ceylon through to 1945. It was assigned to XXXVIII Corps and used in deception plans for the invasion of Sumatra (Fang). | |
| 15th Armoured Division | Jul 1942 | Nov 1943 | White unicorn on black field | Cascade | This notional division was based in the Cairo area of Egypt, and played the role of the British strategic reserve. It was provided with a background of having arrived from the UK in April 1942. It was notionally composed of a bogus 7th and 35th Armoured Brigades, as well as the real 200th Guards Motor Brigade. In November 1943, the division was notionally converted into the 15th Motorised Division. | |
| 15th Motorised Division | Nov 1943 | End of the war | White unicorn on black field | Cascade, Fang | Notionally converted from the 15th Armoured Division, it comprised the 33rd and the 77th Motorised Brigades. In May 1944, it was assigned to the notional XVI Corps of the Twelfth Army, to pose a threat to targets in the Eastern Mediterranean. In 1945, it notionally moved to British India to undergo jungle warfare training, and reinforced the XX Indian Corps to threaten an attack on Sumatra (Fang). | |
| 20th Armoured Division | Mar 1943 | Unknown | Orange tortoise on a black field | Cascade, Turpitude | The division was notionally based in Palestine, provided with a backstory of having arrived in the Middle East, from the UK, in August 1942. The division notionally comprised the 87th Armoured and the 88th Motorised Infantry Brigades. By May 1944, the division had been assigned to the Ninth Army and was based near Aleppo, Syria, as part of a deception effort that purposed a British advance through a friendly Turkey in order to invade Greece (Turpitude). | |
| 21st Division | Unknown | End of the war | N/A | Claw | It is unknown when this division was notionally formed or what it comprised. In 1945, the division was assigned to the notional XX Indian Corps to feign an attack near Rangoon to cut-off retreating Japanese forces in Burma (Claw). In May 1945, it was reassigned to notionally reinforce the actual Fourteenth Army. | |
| 23rd Division | Jul 1942 | May 1943 | An anchor | Cascade | A real division that had been disbanded in 1940 was notionally revived in July 1942 and assigned to the defense of Egypt. It was composed of the fictitious Royal Marines brigade, the 84th Infantry, and the 38th Indian Infantry Brigade. The division was portrayed by the actual Royal Marine Mobile Naval Base Defense Organization, which was based in Egypt. The division was removed from the order of battle in May 1943, when the actual Royal Marines unit transferred to Asia. | |
| 26th Armoured Division | Unknown | Unknown | White elephant head on blue square | N/A | It is unknown when the division was notionally formed or what it comprised. It was based in British India in 1945. | |
| 32nd Division (Air Transit) | Mar 1945 | End of the war | White elephant head on green square | N/A | It is unknown when the division was notionally formed or what it comprised. It was based in British India in 1945, and was assigned to the XXVI Airborne Corps in July 1945. | |
| 33rd Division | Late 1942 | End of the war | Yellow hammer on black circle (or square) | Wantage, Fang | The division notionally arrived in Ceylon in late 1942, and was composed of the 97th, 98th, and 109th Infantry Brigades. Between January and March 1944, the division was notionally transferred to Egypt (Wantage), and then was assigned to the notional Twelfth Army. In 1945, it notionally returned to Ceylon and was assigned to the XXXVIII Indian Corps for a purported attack on Sumatra (Fang). | |
| 34th Division | May 1943 | End of the war | 4×4 checkerboard | Cascade, Wantage, Second Undercut, Penknife | Notionally formed in May 1943 and located in Algiers, it was provided with a backstory of having arrived on 25 March from the UK. The division comprised the notional 39th Infantry, the 81st Infantry, and the 83rd Armoured Brigades, and adopted the division's First World War insignia. In January 1944, the division was transferred to the Middle East and assigned to the notional XVI Corps of the Twelfth Army (Wantage). In 1944, it was transferred to the real III Corps and used to bolster the impression of the British force based in Greece (Second Undercut). It then notionally transferred to Italy, as a replacement for the real 1st Infantry Division which moved to the Middle East (Penknife). | |
| 40th Infantry Division | Nov 1943 | Jun 1944 | acorn on white diamond | Cascade, Foynes | The 43rd Infantry Brigade was based in Sicily and assigned to internal security duties along the Allied lines of communication. It was redesignated as the 40th Infantry Division on 9 November 1943, and adopted a sign alluding to the division's First World War insignia. The brigade's actual battalions consisted of men not suitable for frontline duties; with minimal transport and lacking heavy weapons, they simulated the 119th, the 120th, and the 121st Infantry Brigades. The brigadier held the local rank of major-general, and the battalion commanders flew brigadier pennants to further simulate the division. The division's initial purpose was to inflate the British order of battle in the region, to cover the withdrawal of real units back to the UK (Foynes). During 1944, the division notionally moved between French Tunisia and Sicily and was disbanded on 17 June 1944. | |
| 42nd Division | Nov 1943 | End of the war | White diamond within a red diamond | Cascade, Foynes, Vendetta | This notional division revived the actual 42nd (East Lancashire) Infantry Division which had been converted to an armoured division before being disbanded in October 1943. It was notionally dispatched from the UK to the Mediterranean area, as a replacement for real formations that were being returned to England (Foynes). The division comprised the notional 133rd, the 142nd, and the 149th Infantry Brigades. In 1944, the division was assigned to the notional US XXXI Corps, which was used to project a threat towards southern France with a planned landing to establish a defensive position between Montpellier and Clermont-l'Hérault (Vendetta). From December 1944 to the end of the war, the division was purportedly based in Terni, Italy, and assigned to the notional XIV Corps. | |
| 55th (West Lancashire) Infantry Division | Existing | End of the war | red rose on stem with five leaves on either side | Fortitude | An actual division that was part of the Territorial Army and had been in existence since 1908. By 1944, the division had been drained of manpower to the point of being disbanded and was then maintained for deception purposes. During 1944, the division was assigned to the notional II Corps of the Fourth Army for the purported attack on Norway (Fortitude North). In June 1944, the division alongside the II Corps was transferred to FUSAG to threaten an Allied landing in the Pas de Calais region of France (Fortitude South II). After the Fortitude South plan ended, the division resumed its role as an actual training formation within England. | |
| 57th Division | Nov 1943 | End of the war (Note: H. F. Joslen, who compiled the official history on the British order of battle during the war, stated when the 42nd Brigade was disbanded on 29 July 1944, the 57th Division was likewise disbanded. Thaddeus Holt, who wrote about the British deception formations, stated that the formation was kept alive through to the end of the war.) | red curve crossed by a white bar, on a black square | Cascade, Foynes, Second Undercut | This notional division was formed in North Africa on 9 November 1943, when the 42nd Infantry Brigade was redesignated. The cover story stated that the division had arrived from the UK during September. The First World War's 57th (2nd West Lancashire) Division insignia was reused (German intelligence depicted the division's insignia being inverted), and the division notionally contained the 170th, the 171st, and the 172nd Infantry Brigades. The brigades were simulated by the real battalions assigned to the 42nd Brigade, and its commander held the local rank of major-general. The division's initial purpose was to inflate the British order of battle in the region, to cover the withdrawal of real units back to the UK (Foynes). In late 1944, it was notionally transferred to Terni, Italy, and assigned to the bogus XIV Corps. This was followed by a fictitious transfer to Greece to reinforce British forces based there (Second Undercut). | |
| 58th Division | May 1944 | Apr 1945 | Stag's head on a black square | Fortitude | When the actual 3rd Infantry Division was removed from the notional Fourth Army's order of battle at the time of Exercise Fabius (in order to be sent into action in Normandy), British planners decided to replace it with a notional division to maintain the threat of a purported attack on Norway (Fortitude North). They notionally created the 58th Division, knowing that the Germans already believed it to exist near Windsor, England. It notionally controlled the 173rd, the 174th, and the 175th Infantry Brigades. It was purportedly based south of Inverness, Scotland, and then moved to various locations in Scotland while conducting training. In July 1944, the division moved to England with the notional II Corps, and joined FUSAG in the threat towards the French Pas de Calais region (Fortitude South II). The division continued to be moved around England before it was disbanded. | |
| 59th (Staffordshire) Infantry Division | Oct 1944 | End of the war | stylized red winching tower on a black triangle on a blue rectangular background | N/A | An actual division that was dispersed in Normandy, France, on 26 August, although it formal disbanding was delayed for two months until 19 October 1944. The division was then retained for deception purposes and was assigned to the notional II Corps that had notionally joined the 21st Army Group. | |
| 64th Division | Unknown | Unknown | Castle flanked by dolphins, with a trident | Fang | It is not known when this bogus division was formed, ceased to exist, what it comprised, and its insignia not certain. The division was based in British India, assigned to the notional XX Indian Corps in 1945, with the role of training to take part in the purported attack on Sumatra (Fang). | |
| 68th Division | Nov 1943 | Nov 1943 | red diamond on a blue background | Foynes | The actual 61st Infantry Division was assigned a notional role in Operation Foynes, which aimed to inflate the British order of battle in the Mediterranean to cover the withdrawal of real units to the UK. It was then switched with the newly created phantom 68th Division, which maintained the 61st Division's insignia. The 68th was to be used to reinforce the notional order of battle if needed, but was never used. | |
| 70th Division | Nov 1943 | Jun 1945 | red four-pointed star on white background | N/A | This formation was maintained on the order of battle for deception purposes after the actual division was broken-up in British India. | |
| 76th Division | Sep 1944 | End of the war | profile of a red sailboat on black square | Trolleycar | This notional division was retained for deception purposes after the actual formation was disbanded in the UK on 1 September 1944. It notionally controlled the 25th, the 213th, and the 215th Infantry Brigades. It was assigned to the notional II Corps and transferred to Europe, to reinforce the 21st Army Group. In November 1944, the division was used to threaten a British attack to the west of Arnhem (Trolleycar). | |
| 77th Division | Nov 1944 | End of the war | Red sword held above three wavy blue lines, on black rectangle | N/A | This notional division was retained for deception purposes after the actual formation was disbanded in the UK on 1 September 1944. It notionally controlled the 103rd, the 203rd, and the 209th Infantry Brigades. The division was purportedly held in reserve within the UK and not used in any particular deception effort. | |
| 80th Division | Sep 1944 | Apr 1945 | red transport ship cruising on blue water with yellow sky | Fortitude South II | This division was retained on the order of battle for deception purposes when the actual training formation was disbanded in the UK on 1 September 1944. It notionally controlled the 50th, the 208th, and the 211th Infantry Brigades. Prior to the actual division being disbanded, the training formation was used to simulate a combat-ready division within the notional II Corps of the Fourth Army (Fortitude South II). The phantom division remained with the notional Fourth Army and was moved around England before being disbanded in April 1945. | |
| 83rd (West African) Division | Unknown | Unknown | Palm tree | Fang | No information is known about the notional composition of the division, which was assigned to XX Corps in 1945 and the purported invasion of Sumatra (Fang). | |
| 90th Division | Late 1944 | Unknown | Unknown | N/A | The formation notionally comprised the 72nd, the 73rd, and the 74th Infantry Brigades. The division was created in the autumn of 1944, and used to feign part of a force ready to occupy Norway if German forces withdrew. | |

== Independent brigades ==
List of brigades
| Formation name | Date created | Date ceased to exist | Insignia | Deception plan | Notes | Ref |
|---|---|---|---|---|---|---|
| 1st Special Air Service Brigade | 1941 | Unknown | Unknown | Abeam, Cascade | Initially formed to exploit an Axis concern that the British military had airborne forces based in the Middle East (Abeam). The Special Air Service, which formed in 1941 as a small unit, was dubbed the 1st SAS Brigade to further the deception effort. The notional brigade was maintained through the war, and joined the notional 4th Airborne Division in 1943. | |
| 7th Air Landing Brigade | 1943 | Unknown | Unknown | Cascade, Windscreen | The notional formation was used to feign a landing near Tripoli, Italian Libya, in the period of December 1942 to January 1943, to cut off retreating Axis forces following the Second Battle of El Alamein. | |
| 10th Armoured Brigade | 1942 | Unknown | Unknown | Cascade | Formed in 1942 as part of Operation Cascade and included in the Cyprus garrison. | |
| 24th Armoured Brigade | Aug 1943; Jul 1944 | May 1944; End of the war | N/A | Turpitude, Fortitude | Formed on 23 August 1943, when the 74th Armoured Brigade was redesignated, to organised the use of inflatable dummy tanks for deception purposes. The brigade's dummy tanks were used to simulate the 20th Armoured Division, which was notionally based at Aleppo, Syria. From 26 May to 14 July 1944, the brigade was redesignated as the 87th Armoured Brigade. The brigade was then based within the UK, and assisted in the final stages of Operation Fortitude including the dismantling of dummy vehicles and landing craft. | |
| 27th Armoured Brigade | Unknown | Unknown | Unknown | Inclination | In October 1944, this notional brigade was used in a tactical deception effort, purportedly assigned to the 3rd Canadian Division, and was concentrating near Maldegem, Belgium (Inclination). An actual 27th Armoured Brigade had existed and fought in Normandy, but had been disbanded, and its units disperesed to replenish other armoured units in the Normandy campaign. | |
| 33rd Armoured Brigade | 1942 | Unknown | Unknown | Cascade | The brigade was notionally created in 1942 to inflate the British order of battle in Egypt and was represented by dummy tanks. An actual 33rd Tank Brigade existed at the same time as the fictional formation; it was based in the UK, and in March 1944 was redesignated as the 33rd Armoured Brigade and deployed to fight in northwest Europe with the 21st Army Group. | |
| 42nd Tank Brigade | Unknown | Unknown | Triangle within a circle within a square | N/A | The brigade was notionally based in British India. No further information is known about the formation. | |
| 74th Armoured Brigade | Jul 1942 | Aug 1943 | N/A | N/A | The brigade was formed in Egypt on 5 July 1942, to organise the use of inflatable dummy tanks for deception purposes. The brigade's dummy tanks were utilised during the Second Battle of El Alamein. On 23 August 1943, the brigade was redesignated as the 24th Armoured Brigade. | |
| 87th Armoured Brigade | May 1944 | Jul 1944 | N/A | N/A | A dummy tank brigade formed in Egypt on 26 May 1944, when the 24th Armoured Brigade was redesignated. On 14 July 1944, the brigade reverted to being named the 24th Armoured Brigade. | |
| 103rd Special Service Brigade | Unknown | Unknown | Spiked club | N/A | Notionally based in British India. No further information is known about the formation. | |
| 104th Special Service (Commando) Brigade | Unknown | Unknown | Black mask | N/A | Notionally based in Ceylon in early 1945. No other information is known about the phantom formation. | |

== Notes ==
Footnotes

Citations
