= Operation Ironside =

1944 military deception operation

- Part of Operation Bodyguard
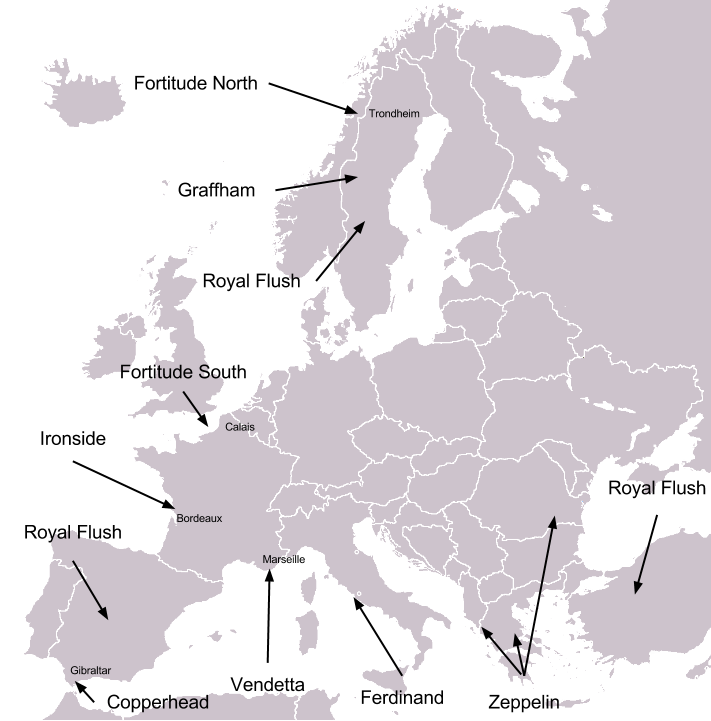
- Ironside was one of several plans within the larger Operation Bodyguard deception (contemporary boundaries shown).
- Operational scope: Political deception
- Location: Bay of Biscay
- Planned: December 1943 – March 1944
- Planned by: London Controlling Section
- Target: Bordeaux
- Date: May–July 1944
- Executed by: Agents Bronx, Tate, Rudloff and Garbo

Operation Ironside was a Second World War military deception undertaken by the Allies in 1944. It formed part of Operation Bodyguard, a broad strategic deception plan instigated by the Allies throughout the year to help cover the June 1944 invasion of Normandy. Ironside supported the overall deception by suggesting to the Germans that the Allies would subsequently land along the Bay of Biscay. It complemented efforts to deceive the Germans into believing that the Allies would also land in southern France at this time (Operation Vendetta). Bordeaux was an important port for the German war effort and had already been a target of commando raids two years earlier. Ironside intended to play on German fears of an invasion in the region, with the aim of tying down defensive forces following Operation Overlord in June 1944.

Planned by the London Controlling Section, Ironside was communicated to the Germans via double agents between May and June 1944. Unlike other Bodyguard deceptions, the plan was put across entirely by double agents without support by physical deception. Agent Bronx took the lead with support from Tate, Rudloff and Garbo. Ironside's story included an initial two-division assault, using Overlord formations, staged out of the United Kingdom. This would then be followed up with six divisions sailing from the east coast of the United States. Historians disagree on the impact of Ironside on German plans. There is no indication that the operation was successful in convincing the Germans of imminent Allied plans to invade the Bay of Biscay. On the other hand, Allied planners attributed the delay of a panzer division moving to Normandy in part to the deception.

As Ironside was a marginal operation, and they were worried about exposing agents as false, the Twenty Committee for the most part used less important agents and added words of caution to the messages they sent, reducing the impact of the story. Allied landings around Bordeaux may also have seemed implausible because it was beyond air cover from the UK and lacked the normal physical elements (such as naval activities and dummy landing craft) associated with an invasion.

After the operation closed, at the end of June 1944, the threat of invasion from the United States was informally kept alive. It was revisited as Ironside II in mid-July as support for Operation Ferdinand. The invasion story was replaced with a supposed Allied plan to increase French resistance in the Bordeaux region to tie up German forces. Most of Ironside II was ignored by the Germans, whose interest had turned away from the region.

== Background ==
Operation Ironside formed part of Operation Bodyguard, a broad strategic military deception intended to confuse the Axis high command as to Allied intentions during the lead-up to the Normandy landings. The overall aim of Bodyguard was to tie down German forces away from Normandy by threatening other targets. Ironside's specific objective was to tie up the 17th SS and 11th Panzer divisions deployed in the south of France.

Overall planning for Bodyguard and Ironside rested with John Bevan and the London Controlling Section (LCS). The LCS had been set up in 1942 following successes in deception in the Middle East by Dudley Clarke. After initial attempts at deception planning the department was tasked with bringing Bodyguard to fruition. One of their most useful deception channels was through double agents. During the early stages of the war, the Abwehr (German intelligence) had sent spies to Britain, but all of them either surrendered or were captured. Some, along with other volunteers, were used as an extensive misinformation network under the control of the Twenty Committee.

Bordeaux was an important port for the German war effort, receiving a great deal of cargo, mostly raw materials, from overseas. It was also a major naval base, with huge submarine pens for U-boats. The Gironde estuary and Bordeaux had already been a target for the Allies. Operation Frankton was a 1942 commando raid targeting important shipping in the port. In January 1944, the Allies intercepted communications indicating that German commanders were concerned by the possibility of landings in the Bay of Biscay region of France. The next month, German naval and air units undertook anti-invasion exercises in the area. Ironside was intended to amplify these concerns.

According to the storyline for Ironside, ten days following D-Day, Allied forces would land in the Bordeaux region. This force would spend around twelve days establishing a bridgehead before advancing to meet formations supposedly part of an invasion of the Mediterranean coast of France (in reality these were fictional landings as well, part of another Bodyguard deception called Operation Vendetta). The supposed target of Ironside was the mouth of the Gironde estuary, with a landing site at Royan.

At first, Bevan suggested that the fictional invasion force should stage from the American East Coast. Newman Smith, based out of New York and responsible for the US elements of the deception, felt this was an unrealistic story and suggested a large force from the US might conceivably reinforce a bridgehead established by units from the UK. Formations intended for Normandy could be "re-purposed" for the initial invasion. The final plan earmarked two Overlord divisions for the assault with the supposed reinforcements consisting of six real divisions (the 26th, 94th, 95th, and 104th Infantry, and the 10th and 11th Armored) under the notional command of Lieutenant General Lloyd Fredendall.

== Operation ==
Send £50 quickly. I have need of a dentist.

— Coded message sent by Agent Bronx, 29 May 1944

Ironside began on 23 May 1944 with the aim of having the threat established by 29 May and continued until 28 June (22 days after the Normandy landings). It was implemented via double agents, in Britain and the United States, under the control of the Twenty Committee. The operation did not receive any resources from the Allied navies or airforce, so the deception had no physical element. This meant that Ironside had none of the traditional accompaniments to an invasion, including reconnaissance flights, bombardment, and naval operations. As a result, the Twenty Committee was cautious about using important agents to pass over the deception.

The lead was given to the less important Agent Bronx, a Peruvian socialite named Elvira Chaudoir, who communicated with her German handlers via letter. From April 1944, she had also begun sending codes as telegrams, which were faster than letters in the event of an imminent invasion. Her code was based on a financial theme, assigning different amounts of money to possible invasion sites. Mentioning her doctor (almost certain) or dentist (certain) showed Chaudoir's confidence in the information. Asking for the money "straight away", "urgently" or "quickly" identified when the invasion would take place (within a week, a fortnight or a month, respectively).

Agent Tate (a Dane sent to England in 1941 and turned double shortly after) opened the operation, on 23 May, in a message to his German handlers stating that a friend from the US had identified an expeditionary force, consisting of six divisions, preparing to sail. On 29 May, Bronx sent a telegram identifying an invasion targeted at the Bordeaux region within a month, using the code "dentist" to say she was certain of the information. She also sent a follow-up letter explaining that the information came from a drunken British officer in the Four Hundred Club who had later sworn her to secrecy. According to Bronx, the officer had boasted about an airborne assault in the Bordeaux region that would be in the papers the following morning. The next day he had told her the operation had been delayed by a month.

Although many messages were sent by agents, the Twenty Committee considered that Ironside was quite unrealistic and as a result was cautious about promoting it too heavily. Most of the information was sent with words of caution or uncertainty to ensure that the agent would not be compromised. One of the most critical Bodyguard agents, Garbo, did become involved on 5 June, but only in forwarding the message of a fictional sub-agent who he had already identified as unreliable (MI5 hoped that this would cover for, in their opinion, the implausible nature of the story). The agent's report explained that a US division based in Liverpool was preparing to head to Bordeaux.

Messages were also sent from the US. Rudloff, an agent based in the New York, sent four reports between 2 and 20 June. He identified the six divisions under Fredendall being sidelined for specialist training in bridge building but not amphibious assault and under heavy security. A last-minute deception involved an MI6 transmitter in France. Known to be under German control, when the operator asked about routes to send escaped prisoners of war the handlers replied that they should, from 15 June, be sent toward Bordeaux.

== Impact ==
German intelligence documents indicate that there was never strong belief that the Allies were ready to land in the Bordeaux region. Intercepted situation reports suggested that the Germans believed rumours of landings in the area to be "cover operations of small caliber" and part of the cover for a main Allied thrust at Calais (in itself a deception called Operation Fortitude South). Axis commanders had considered the idea and conducted exercises in preparation, and training continued in the region after D-Day. Following the Normandy invasion, the Allies had expected both German divisions in the Bordeaux area to mobilize. In the end, only the 17th SS Panzer Division moved north, and even they were delayed by several days, while the 11th Panzer Division remained to guard the region.

Historians are divided over whether the deception played a major role in the German response. Most, such as historian Ben McIntyre, agree that Ironside added to the general picture of confusion for the German commanders. McIntyre quotes senior Allied figures, such as John Masterman (chair of the Twenty committee) and Hugh Astor (MI5), who attributed the delayed German response in part to Ironside. Michael Howard dismisses the impact of the operation saying that there is "no evidence that anyone took them seriously".

Part of the problem was that Bordeaux may not have appeared a plausible Allied target because it was out of range of fighter aircraft cover from the United Kingdom. Historian Terry Crowdy's analysis is that Ironside may have suffered simply from lack of resources. In common with other, higher-impact, Bodyguard deceptions it preyed on a concern that the Allies knew Hitler and the German High Command had discussed. Crowdy suggests that with physical deception, and more effort, Ironside could have succeeded in the same way as deceptions aimed against Calais, Normandy and the Mediterranean.

== Ironside II ==
John Bevan had asked Newman Smith to retain the threat of a US invasion force beyond 28 June when the initial deception was supposed to have ended. Agent Rudloff sent messages on 10, 12 and 18 July referring to the Ironside force. In mid-July, the Allies began Operation Ferdinand, a cover deception for Operation Dragoon, the August 1944 invasion of southern France. The Ironside story was considered as an option in support of Ferdinand, but Noel Wild and Ops (B), the SHAEF deception planners were worried about the impact of a theoretical US invasion force on the continuing Fortitude deception. It was decided that a new story would be presented to the Germans, suggesting that the Allies intended to bolster French resistance in the south of the country. The operation went largely unnoticed and German interest in the Bordeaux region dissipated.
