= List of Allied deception formations in World War II =

Fictional Commonwealth units during WW2

== Canadian ==
List of armies
Formation name	Date created	Date ceased to exist	Insignia	Deception plan	Notes	Ref
Unnamed armoured formation				Euphrates plan	The deception effort stated Canadian armoured forces had arrived in Egypt, after travelling directly from Canada. The force notionally moved to Palestine and made camp near Palmyra. An area was cordoned off for this alleged training camp. Soldiers were outfitted with Canadian insignia and money and visited numerous locations throughout Palestine. Vichy French (pro-Axis) forces were informed to be on alert for French-Canadian deserters.	

== French ==
List of armies
Formation name	Date created	Date ceased to exist	Insignia	Deception plan	Notes	Ref
III Corps						
IV Corps						
French Expeditionary Corps for the Far East						
7th Algerian Infantry Division						
8th Algerian Infantry Division						
3rd Armoured Division						
10th Colonial Infantry Division						

== Greek ==
List of armies
Formation name	Date created	Date ceased to exist	Insignia	Deception plan	Notes	Ref
1st Greek Division	1942	Unknown	The head of goddess Athena in white on a blue square		A cascade formation formed in the Middle East in 1942, reconstituted in 1944. Located in the eastern Mediterranean and part of the Ninth Army, in May 1944, it was composed of 1st, 2nd and 3rd Greek Brigade Groups.	

== Indian ==
List of armies
Formation name	Date created	Date ceased to exist	Insignia	Deception plan	Notes	Ref
Indian Expeditionary Force	Unknown	Jun 1945	A sword, trident and wings	Operation Fang	A real formation that existed between March and October 1943. Recreated as an army-size commanding force for the threatened invasion of Sumatra (Fang) and was notionally based in India and Ceylon. It was notionally composed of XX and XXXVIII Indian Corps and was replaced by Force 144 in June 1945. The insignia invoked symbols of all three branches of the military.	
Force 114						
XX Indian Corps						
XXXVIII Indian Corps						
Airborne Raiding Task Force					An Indian Army corps sized deception formation	
2nd Indian Division						
6th Indian Division						
9th Indian Airborne Division						
12th Indian Division						
15th Indian Division						
16th Indian Division						
18th Indian Division						
21st Indian Division						
32nd Indian Armoured Division						
234th Indian Division						
Frontier Armoured Division						
Nepalese Division						
1st Burma Division						
51st Indian Tank Brigade						

== New Zealand ==
List of formations
Formation name	Date created	Date ceased to exist	Insignia	Deception plan	Notes	Ref
3rd New Zealand Division	May 1942	May 1942	A Kiwi	Cascade	The original New Zealand contribution to Operation Cascade. The division title was soon dropped and replaced by the 6th New Zealand Division, as a real 3rd New Zealand Division was being formed for service Pacific theatre. The real formation became active in August 1942.	
6th New Zealand Division	May 1942	Oct 1944	A Kiwi	Cascade	The replacement for the 3rd New Zealand Division. The division was physically portrayed by the Middle East depot area of the 2nd New Zealand Expeditionary Force at Maadi Camp near Cairo. Various real small units were renamed and used to portray the 9th New Zealand Infantry Brigade and other divisional troops. (Note: HQ NZ Maadi Camp: HQ 6 NZ Division HQ Company, II NZ Maadi Camp: 6 NZ Div Defence Platoon 1 NZ Works Section: 25 NZ Field Company NZ Artillery Training Depot: 32 NZ Field Company NZ Infantry Training Depot: 9 NZ Infantry Brigade the Northern, Central, and Southern Companies: 31, 32, and 33 Battalions NZ Base Field Security Section: 6 NZ Division Field Security Section NZ Base Signals: 6 NZ Division Signals NZ Base Provost Company: 6 NZ Provost Company HQ NZ Base NZ Army Service Corps: HQ 6 NZ Division Army Service Corps NZ Base Supply Depot: 6 NZ Div Supply Company NZ Base Transport Platoon: 17 NZ General Transport Company NZ Base Ordnance Workshops: 6 NZ Division Ordnance Workshops 1 NZ Camp Hospital: 23 NZ Field Ambulance NZ Base Hygiene Section: 6 NZ Division Hygiene Section.) For example, the camp hospital became 23 NZ Field Ambulance, and the camp workshop portrayed the 25 NZ Field Company. The division notionally remained in North Africa until October 1944, when a fictitious transfer to the Pacific theatre took place. No further information available on if the division was used beyond its notional transfer. If the 10th and 11th Brigades were notionally formed in a similar manner is disputed between sources. (Note: Thaddeus Holt, who wrote The Deceivers: Allied Military Deception in the Second World War, stated that both brigades were depicted in a similar manner to the 9th Brigade. Malcolm Thomas and Cliff Lord, who wrote New Zealand Army Distinguishing Patches 1911–1991 and detailed the breakdown of each part of Maadi Camp that portrayed the division, do not support the brigades being "created".)	

== Polish ==
List of armies
Formation name	Date created	Date ceased to exist	Insignia	Deception plan	Notes	Ref
III Polish Corps						
2nd Polish Armoured Division						
7th Polish Division						
8th Polish Division						

== South Africa ==
List of armies
Formation name	Date created	Date ceased to exist	Insignia	Deception plan	Notes	Ref
7th South African Division						

== Notes ==
Footnotes

Citations
