= Twelfth Army (United Kingdom) =

- 12th Army formation badge.
- Active: May — November 1945
- Country: United Kingdom
- Branch: British Army
- Type: Army
- Size: Field army
- Engagements: Battle of the Sittang Bend

The Twelfth Army was a British Army formation during the Second World War. The Twelfth Army denotation was actually used twice; firstly, in 1943, for a fictional formation and secondly, in 1944/45, in Burma.

The Twelfth Army moniker was originally used by Advanced Headquarters 'A' Force, a Cairo-based deception department created by Dudley Clarke, for a formation used in Operation Barclay and Operation Zeppelin. It was later used for a real formation in Burma, which took over operations from the Fourteenth Army and would later become Burma Command.

== 1943: Middle East ==
A British Twelfth Army was initially invented by 'A' Force as part as the deception plan (Operation Mincemeat) for Operation Husky, the Allied invasion of Sicily in July 1943. The Western Allies attempted to convince the Germans that their main effort during 1943 would be to land the Twelfth Army in Greece and then advance into the eastern Balkans during the early part of the summer of 1943 with the aim of bringing Turkey into the war and then linking up with the Soviet Red Army. The deception plan attempted to convince the Germans that this army had twelve divisions under its control and was located in Egypt. The army's formation insignia was a trained seal balancing on its nose a terrestrial globe showing the Eastern Hemisphere, black on a white background. The insignia was supposed to symbolize an amphibious creature treating the whole world as its own.

=== Subordinate units ===
Between 1943 and 1945, when it was disbanded to allow the formation of the second British Twelfth Army, its nominal existence was used to create the impression of a standing threat to the Balkans. During this period the units shown under its control varied, depending on the target chosen. The following list includes all units mentioned as forming part of the Twelfth Army or its component corps.

==== Corps ====
- British III Corps (fictional)
- British XIV Corps (fictional)
- British XVI Corps (fictional)
- Polish III Corps (fictional)

==== Divisions ====
- Polish 2nd Armored Division
- British 4th Airborne Division (fictional)
- British 5th Airborne Division (fictional)
- British 5th Infantry Division
- Polish 7th Infantry Division
- British 8th Armoured Division (fictional)
- Polish 8th Infantry Division (fictional)
- British 15th Motorized Division (fictional)
- British 33rd Infantry Division (fictional)
- British 34th Infantry Division (fictional)
- British 40th Infantry Division (fictional)
- British 42nd Infantry Division (fictional)
- British 56th Infantry Division
- British 57th Infantry Division (fictional)

== 1945: Burma ==
The insignia of the second British Twelfth Army

The second British Twelfth Army was formed on 28 May 1945, to take control of operations in Burma from the Fourteenth Army, which was being withdrawn to plan for Operation Zipper, the planned invasion of Malaya by amphibious assault, which was due to take place in August 1945. The army HQ was created by re-designating the HQ of the Indian XXXIII Corps, under Lieutenant-General Sir Montagu Stopford.

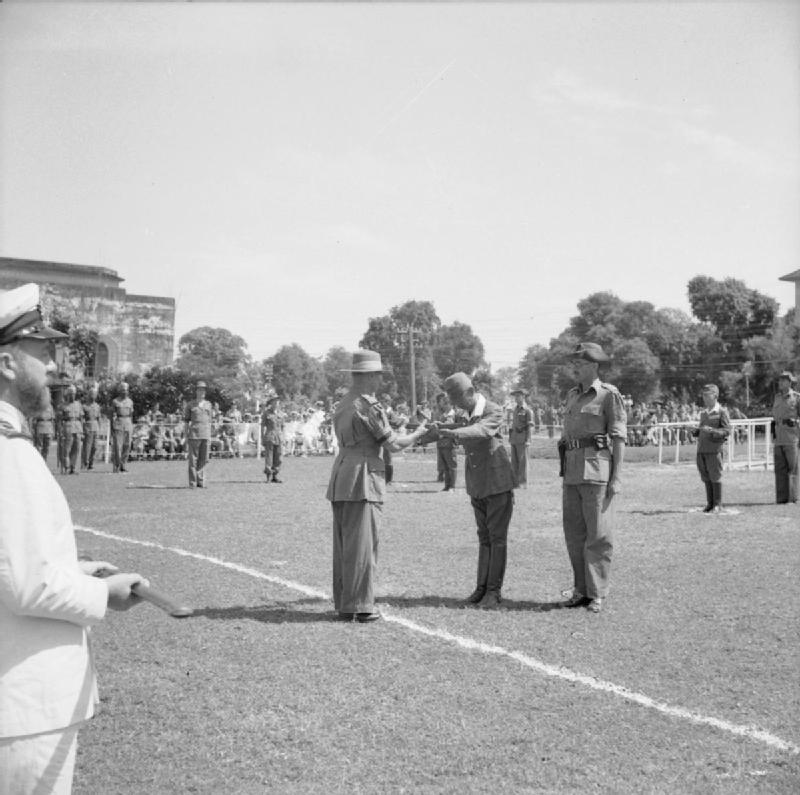
Lieutenant General Sakurai, an officer from the staff of Japanese General Kimura, hands over his sword to Brigadier J. D. Shapland his opposite number on the staff of the British Twelfth Army at a formal ceremony held in Rangoon.

After the war, Twelfth Army continued in existence until 1 October, when it was re designated Burma Command. The formation insignia was a Chinthe on a red background, with a superimposed horizontal black stripe on which was written "XII" in white letters.
