= Operation Vendetta =

Operation Vendetta may refer to:

- A subsidiary plan of the 1944 Operation Zeppelin (deception plan)
- Part of the Battle of Long Tan
