= The Deceivers: Allied Military Deception in the Second World War =

Military history book by Thaddeus Holt

- First edition (UK)
- Author: Thaddeus Holt
- Language: English
- Subject: World War II, military deception
- Genre: Historical
- Publisher: Weidenfeld & Nicolson (UK); Scribners (US)
- Publication date: 11 November 2004
- Pages: 1,148
- ISBN: 978-0-2978-4804-2 (UK); 978-0-7432-5042-9 (US)

The Deceivers: Allied Military Deception in the Second World War, by Thaddeus Holt, is a 2004 historical account of Allied military deception during the Second World War. The book focuses primarily on the work of Dudley Clarke in the Middle East, John Bevan in London, William H. Baumer and Newman Smith in Washington, and Peter Fleming in the Far East, detailing their work in creating strategic and tactical deceptions for the Allied forces.

Generally well received by critics, the book was described by historian Max Hastings as a "worthy celebration" of British deception during the war. Some reviewers, however, criticised the extensive detail and considerable length of Holt's work.

== Synopsis ==
Holt, a lawyer and former deputy under-secretary of the US Army, began work on The Deceivers in the early 1990s, after becoming interested in the strategic deceptions used during Operation Overlord. Over time the scope of the book expanded; the book documents the development of military deception across all Allied forces, from early 1940 until the end of the war. Holt was the first non-official historian allowed access to declassified US war records about deception.

The Deceivers initially focuses on Dudley Clarke, whom the author describes as "the master of the game". It begins with an account of Clarke's collaboration with Archibald Wavell in North Africa, and the founding of the 'A' Force deception department. The Deceivers then moves to London, where Clarke's work was coming to the attention of Allied high command, and the foundation of the London Controlling Section; and to Washington and the foundation of Joint Security Control. Holt follows John Bevan and David Strangeways and their work on the largest strategic deception of the war; Operation Bodyguard. Finally Holt covers the work of Peter Fleming, also collaborating with Wavell, and 'D Division' in the Far East. The book contains four appendices (listing all of the Allied deception operations, double agents, fictional divisions and regional maps) which, along with the footnotes, account for a fifth of the material.

== Critical reception ==
Holt's work received generally positive reviews, although some critics drew attention to the length and extensive detail of the book. Writing for The Guardian, John Latimer called The Deceivers "a monumental work and clearly a labour of love, which provides both its strength and its weakness." He praised the book for its intense detail, noting that Holt's biographical material, particularly for Dudley Clarke, was very good. But said that the level of detail might confuse readers unfamiliar with the subject matter.

Noble Frankland, reviewing for The Spectator, called the subject matter "gripping" but criticised its presentation as "a bewildering series of disjointed chronological, geographical and systematical sequences". Frankland highlighted the detailed sourcing and the "passionate interest" of Holt's work, and praised his measured approach to the conclusions he makes. Holt records how the Axis forces acted as the Allies intended from the outcome of deception activities, but is careful not to attribute this result to the deceptions alone. Despite critiquing the length of the book, Frankland also criticised the lack of detail around air deception during the war.

Historian Max Hastings called the book a "worthy celebration" of British deception and praised Holt's avoidance of the sensational. M. R. D. Foot said of the book, "as good as it is long."
