= XIV Corps (United Kingdom) =

- XIV Corps formation badge.
- Active: 1916–18
- Country: United Kingdom
- Branch: British Army
- Type: Field corps
- Part of: Fourth Army
- Engagements: First World War: Battle of the Somme 1916; Battle of Delville Wood; Battle of Guillemont; Battle of Ginchy; Battle of Flers-Courcelette; Battle of Morval; Battle of Le Transloy; German retreat to the Hindenburg Line; Battle of Passchendaele; Italian Campaign

XIV Corps was a British infantry corps during the First World War. During the Second World War the identity was recreated for deceptive purposes.

== First World War ==
XIV Corps was formed in France on 3 January 1916 under Lieutenant-General the Earl of Cavan. It took part in the Battle of the Somme in 1916; a year later it fought through the Battle of Passchendaele before being redeployed to Italy in November 1917.

=== Subordinate units ===
==== 1918 (Italy) ====
- Corps headquarters & supporting troops.
- British 7th Infantry Division
- British 23rd Infantry Division
- British 48th Infantry Division

== General Officers Commanding ==
Commanders included:

- 11 January – 11 August 1916: Lieutenant-General the Earl of Cavan
- 11 August – 17 August 1916: Lieutenant-General Edward Fanshawe (temporary)
- 17 August – 10 September 1916: Lieutenant-General Sir Thomas Morland (temporary)
- 10 September 1916 – 10 March 1918: Lieutenant-General the Earl of Cavan
- 15 October 1918 – 1919 Lieutenant-General Sir James Babington

== Second World War ==
In the Second World War, the XIV corps was notionally reformed in North Africa in late 1943 as part the cover plan for the Anzio landings. Initially assigned to the British Twelfth Army, the corps was later depicted as being under the command of the United States Seventh Army and finally under the 15th Army Group as the theater reserve for the Italian campaign

=== Insignia ===
The corps insignia in World War II was that of a black wolf's head, with a lolling red tongue superimposed on a white square.

=== Subordinate units ===
As with its original parent formation the "Twelfth Army", the units notionally under command of the "XIV Corps" varied depending on the nature of the threat being depicted.

==== 1943 (Operation Oakfield) ====
- Corps headquarters & supporting troops.
- British 40th Infantry Division (fictional)
- British 42nd Division (fictional)
- British 57th Infantry Division (fictional)

==== 1944 (Operation Zeppelin) ====
- Corps headquarters & supporting troops.
- British 5th Airborne Division (fictional)
- British 40th Infantry Division (fictional)
- British 42nd Division (fictional)
- British 57th Infantry Division (fictional)

==== 1945 (15th Army Group reserve) ====
- Corps headquarters & supporting troops.
- British 42nd Division (fictional)
- British 57th Infantry Division (fictional)

== Bibliography ==
- Edmonds, J. E.; Davies, Sir Henry Rodolph (1949). Military Operations: Italy 1915–1919. History of the Great War based on Official Documents by Direction of the Committee of Imperial Defence. Maps in rear cover folder. London: HMSO. OCLC 4839237.
- Heathcote, T.A. (1999). The British Field Marshals 1736–1997. Pen & Sword Books Ltd. ISBN 0-85052-696-5
- Holt, T (2005). The Deceivers: Allied Military Deception in the Second World War. Phoenix. ISBN 0-7538-1917-1
