= Czechoslovak 11th Infantry Battalion =

Czechoslovak infantry battalion in the Second World War

Czechoslovak 11th Infantry Battalion – East
- Active: 1940 – April 1942
- Country: Czechoslovakia
- Branch: Army
- Type: Infantry
- Engagements: World War II; Battle of France; North Africa Campaign; Siege of Tobruk; Syria–Lebanon Campaign

Commanders
- Colonel of the Regiment: Lt-Col Karel Klapálek, DSO
- Notable commanders: Lt-Col Karel Klapálek, DSO

The Czechoslovak 11th Infantry Battalion – East (Czech: 11. československý pěší prapor — Východní) was a Czechoslovak infantry battalion in the Second World War. It served under the British Middle East Command in the Mediterranean and Middle East Theatre.

== History ==
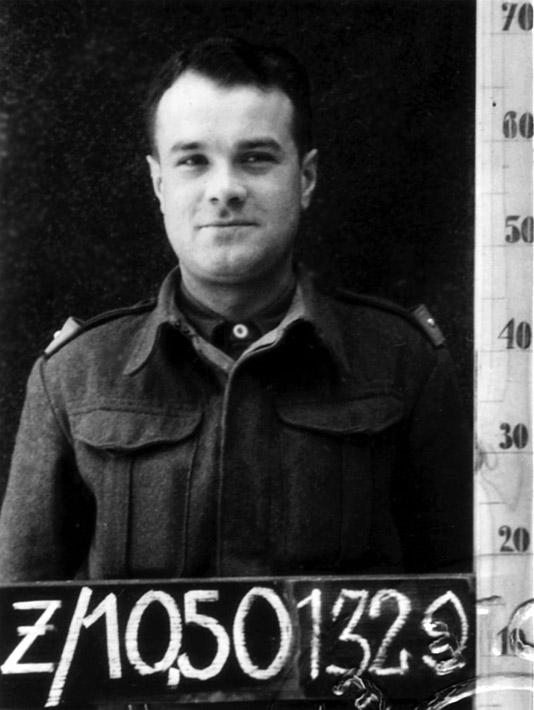
Sgt Emil Toman, a volunteer in the 11th Infantry Battalion

Several thousand Czechoslovak soldiers served in the Battle of France. 206 Czechoslovak Army volunteers were in Beirut, Lebanon, waiting to be posted to join the Czechoslovak 1st Infantry Division in France when, the Armistice of 22 June 1940, France capitulated to Nazi Germany. Vichy France could have interned the men and surrendered them to the German military authorities, had not the Czechoslovak Consul-General in Jerusalem secured visas for them to move to Mandatory Palestine.

The Czechoslovaks were housed in a camp at Al-Sumayriyya north of Acre. Further arrivals increased the group to 280 and it was formed into the 4th Infantry Regiment as part of the Czechoslovak 1st Infantry Division. The regiment was then transferred south to a camp at Gedera near Tel Aviv to be armed and trained. On 1 October 1940 at Gedera the regiment was reconstituted as the 11th Infantry Battalion. Lt-Col Karel Klapálek was appointed commanding officer.

In December 1940 the battalion received acclimatization training and then was posted to Egypt, where it was assigned guard duty at camps first at Sidi Bishr and then at Agami. On 30 May it was put under the command of the British 23rd Infantry Brigade and posted to Sidi Haneish near Mersa Matruh.

In June and July 1941 the 23rd Infantry Brigade, including the Czechoslovak 11th Infantry Battalion, fought in the Allied invasion of Syria and Lebanon. In August the battalion was stationed on Syria's border with Turkey.

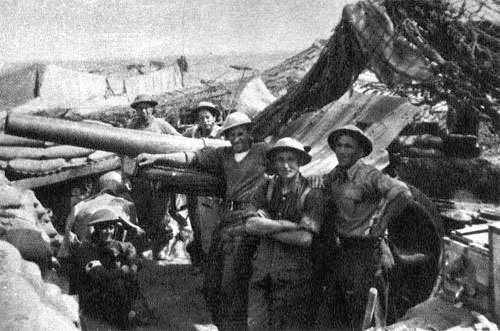
Members of the 11th Infantry Battalion in the Siege of Tobruk in 1941

In August 1941 the Czechoslovak government-in-exile asked for the 11th Battalion to be moved to Britain to be united with Czechoslovak forces there. The British military authorities refused, and instead on 6 October 1941 transferred the battalion from the 23rd Infantry Brigade to the Polish Independent Carpathian Rifle Brigade, which was besieged in Tobruk in Libya. The battalion served at Tobruk for 158 days, including 51 in combat.

At the end of December 1941 the battalion was withdrawn to the rear and transferred to the 38th Indian Infantry Brigade. In April 1942 the battalion was returned to Palestine and in May it was reorganised as the 200th Czechoslovak Light Anti-Aircraft Regiment, with Karel Klapálek continuing as its commander.

== In popular culture ==
The 2008 Czech film Tobruk portrays a Czechoslovak battalion in the Siege of Tobruk in 1941. The film won a Czech Lion Award.

== Sources ==
- Stehlík, Eduard (2009). The Heart of the Army, General Staff 1919–2009. Prague: Ministerstvo obrany České republiky. ISBN 978-80-7278-516-2.
