= 38th Indian Infantry Brigade =

- Active: 1941–1942
- Country: British India
- Allegiance: British Crown
- Branch: British Indian Army
- Size: Brigade
- Engagements: North African Campaign

Commanders
- Notable commanders: Brigadier A H Pollock

The 38th Indian Infantry Brigade was an Infantry formation of the Indian Army during World War II. The brigade was formed in October 1941, at Moascar in Egypt. The brigade only ever came under command of HQ British Troops Egypt and HQ Eighth Army and was disbanded in May 1942, at Tahag in Egypt.

== Formation ==
- 1st Battalion, Royal Welch Fusiliers to December 1941
- 3rd Battalion, 10th Baluch Regiment to April 1942
- 1st Battalion, 1st Punjab Regiment December 1941
- 1st Battalion, Buffs (Royal East Kent Regiment) January 1942
- Czechoslovak 11th Infantry Battalion January to March 1942
- 3rd Battalion, 1st Punjab Regiment January to April 1942
- 68th Medium Artillery Regiment Royal Artillery

== See also ==
- List of Indian Army Brigades in World War II
