= Operation Cascade =

WW2 Allied deception operation

Operation Cascade was the codename for an Allied military deception operation during the Western Desert Campaign of World War II for North Africa. Operation Cascade was one of the first successful Allied deception operations in World War II, and provided valuable experience for later operations.

In 1942, the British forces in the Mediterranean and Middle East were very weak. To deter the Axis from attacking, a deception operation was planned. This operation was started by 'A' force under command of Colonel Dudley Clarke in 1941, and in 1942 eventually evolved into Operation Cascade. The goal of the operation was to create a false order of battle in order to keep the Axis guessing as to the strength of the Allies in the region, by use of bogus troop formations, radio traffic and double agents.

== Implementation ==
In 1941, Advanced Headquarters 'A' Force, the British organization responsible for army deception operations in the Middle East, had already created three bogus formations to deceive the enemy in the Mediterranean Theatre: the 1st SAS Brigade, the 10th Armoured Division in the Western Desert, and the 7th Division to guard Cyprus. This fictional build-up was expanded into a systematic plan to inflate British strength throughout the Middle East. In March 1942, the real strength stood at 5 Armoured and 10 Infantry divisions. Cascade intended to increase this strength, for the benefit of enemy intelligence, to 8 Armoured and 21 infantry divisions.

Bogus units had to be created, and actually shipped from their bases in the United Kingdom, Australia, New Zealand, India and South Africa. An order of battle had to be drawn up for these units, crests and signs had to be created, and some form of physical presence was needed to convince enemy agents that the units existed. False radio traffic for enemy signals intelligence, and information gathered by civilian informers in Egypt, increased the Axis impression that these units were real and present in the theatre. Most of the civilian agents, however, were double agents controlled by 'A' force through a network called Cheese.

Enemy documents, captured during and after the battle of El Alamein, showed that Cascade was a success. An analysis by 'A' force, published on 19 November 1942, showed that enemy intelligence overestimated the armoured strength of the British forces by 40%, and infantry strength by 45%.

== Influence ==
Operation Cascade gave the Allies valuable experience in planning deception operations, which was later used to good effect in the deception operations covering the invasion of Europe (D-Day landings in Normandy, and the invasion of Southern France). The British forces built up during Operation Cascade were later used in Operation Zeppelin to tie down Axis forces in the Balkans and Greece, and deter the Axis from using these forces against the Allied invasion of Sicily, (Operation Husky). In 1944, the actual Allied strength in the Mediterranean totalled about 52 divisions; Axis intelligence accepted a strength of about 70 divisions in the theatre.

== See also ==
- Operation Bertram
