= Dudley Clarke =

British Second World War intelligence officer

Brigadier Dudley Clarke CB CBE
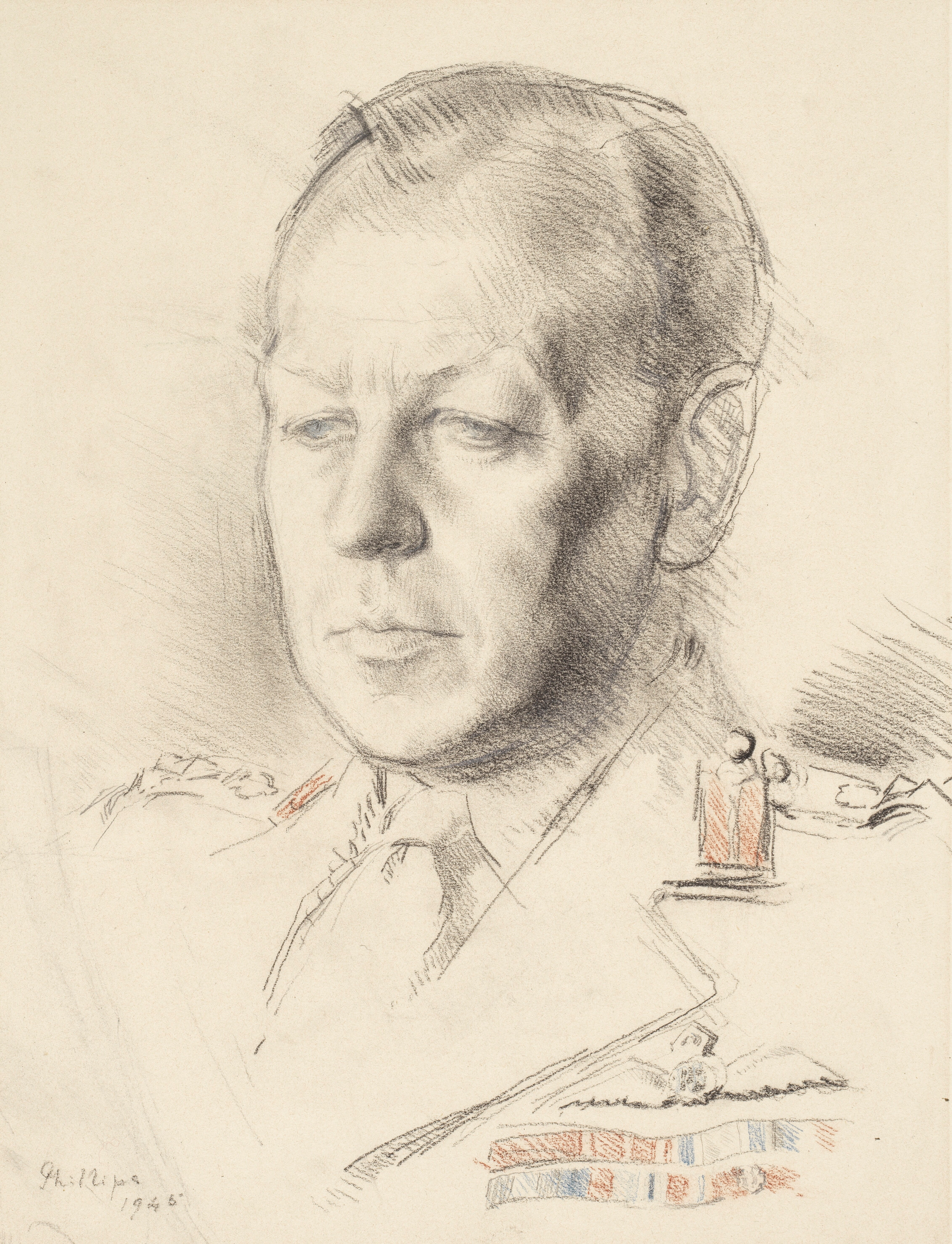
- Born: Dudley Wrangel Clarke; 27 April 1899; Johannesburg, South Africa
- Died: 7 May 1974 (aged 75); London, England
- Education: Charterhouse School; Royal Military Academy, Woolwich
- Relatives: T. E. B. Clarke (younger brother)
- Military career
- Allegiance: United Kingdom
- Branch: British Army; Royal Flying Corps
- Service years: 1916–1947
- Rank: Brigadier
- Service number: 13136
- Conflicts: First World War; Iraqi Revolt; 1936–1939 Arab revolt in Palestine; Second World War
- Awards: Companion of the Order of the Bath; Commander of the Order of the British Empire; Mentioned in Despatches; Officer of the Legion of Merit (United States)

Brigadier Dudley Wrangel Clarke, CB, CBE (27 April 1899 – 7 May 1974) was an officer in the British Army, known as a pioneer of military deception operations during the Second World War. His ideas for combining fictional orders of battle, visual deception and double agents helped define Allied deception strategy during the war, for which he has been referred to as "the greatest British deceiver of WW2".

Clarke was also instrumental in the founding of three famous military units, namely the British Commandos, the Special Air Service, and the naming of the US Rangers.

Born in Johannesburg and brought up near London, Clarke joined the Royal Artillery as an officer in 1916 but transferred to the Royal Flying Corps after finding he was too young to fight in France. He spent the First World War learning to fly, first in Reading and then Egypt. Clarke returned to the Royal Artillery in 1919 and had a varied career doing intelligence work in the Middle East. In 1936 he was posted to Palestine, where he helped organise the British repression of the 1936 Arab uprising. During the Second World War, Clarke joined John Dill's staff, where he proposed and helped to implement an idea for raids into France – an early form of the British Commandos.

In 1940, Archibald Wavell called Clarke to Cairo and placed him in charge of strategic deception. As a cover, he was employed to set up a regional organisation for MI9, a British escape and evasion department. The following year Clarke received a war establishment and set up Advanced Headquarters 'A' Force with a small staff to plan deception operations. Once satisfied with the department's structure, he pursued intelligence contacts in Turkey and Spain.

In late 1941 Clarke was called to London, where his deception work had come to the attention of Allied high command. Shortly afterward, while in Madrid, he was arrested wearing women's clothing, in circumstances that remain unclear. He was released and after being questioned by the governor of Gibraltar, allowed to return to Cairo.

During Clarke's absence, deception hierarchy in Middle East Command had become muddled. Colonel Ralph Bagnold had taken over deception planning, pushing 'A' Force aside. Clarke was sent to El Alamein, where Allied forces were on the retreat, to work on deception plans. Upon his return, Bagnold was sidelined and 'A' Force reinstated as the primary deception department. Throughout 1942 Clarke implemented Operation Cascade, an order of battle deception which added many fictional units to the Allied formations. Cascade was a success; by the end of the war the enemy had accepted most of the formations as real.

From 1942 to 1945, Clarke continued to organise deception in North Africa and southern Europe. After the war, he was asked to record the history of 'A' Force.

He retired in 1947 and lived the rest of his life in relative obscurity. As well as pursuing a literary career that produced two histories and a thriller, he worked for the Conservative Party and was a director of Securicor. He died in London in 1974.

== Early life ==
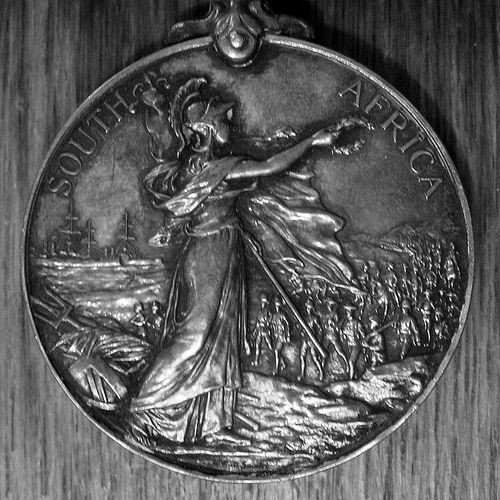
The Queen's South Africa Medal, which Clarke later attempted to claim for his infant presence at the Siege of Ladysmith in 1899

Clarke was born in Johannesburg on 27 April 1899. His father, Ernest Clarke, grew up in Kingston upon Hull and moved to South Africa in the late 19th century, where he became embroiled in the Jameson Raid. Ernest managed to avoid prison for his part in the raid and, via a co-conspirator, obtained a job at a gold mining company. Once settled, Ernest married Madeline Gardiner, and a short while later, Dudley was born. During the Second Boer War, the Clarke family was trapped in the siege of Ladysmith. Although an infant at the time of the siege, Clarke later tried to claim a campaign medal. Soon afterwards, the family returned to England, moving to Watford, where Clarke's brother, the screenwriter T. E. B. Clarke, was born in 1907.

From an early age, Clarke wanted a career in the armed forces. In 1912, he attended Charterhouse School, where he was exposed to the glamorous parties and smart uniforms of the nearby military presence at Aldershot, including the newly formed Royal Flying Corps.

== First World War and inter-war period ==
I've always been a little proud of the fact that, when Britain went to war with Germany on 4th August 1914, I was already in uniform and under arms ... I was only fifteen and a half and no more than a private in the Charterhouse Contingent of the Officers Training corps

— Dudley Clarke, unpublished memoirs

Eager to be in active service, Clarke applied to sit the Army Entrance Exam in 1915, as soon as he had reached the minimum age of sixteen and a half. To his own surprise (he had petitioned the Charterhouse headmaster for a recommendation, allowing him to bypass the exam, on the expectation of failing), he passed and in early 1916 attended the Royal Military Academy, Woolwich.

In November 1916, Clarke was commissioned as a second lieutenant in the Royal Artillery. When his regiment deployed to France, Clarke had to stay behind because, aged 17, he was too young to fight. Frustrated, he applied to join the Royal Flying Corps and transferred to the School of Military Aeronautics in Reading in November 1917. The following April he was posted to Egypt to complete his flight training, where he stayed until January 1919. Despite his promotion to the rank of lieutenant, Clarke transferred back to the Royal Artillery on his return to England.

After the war, Clarke had a varied military career that began with a posting to Mesopotamia in 1919. During the Iraqi revolt of 1920, he helped evacuate Europeans from the region by boat. While on extended leave in Turkey in 1922, he became involved in the Chanak Crisis, a threatened Turkish attack on British and French troops. Clarke volunteered to help the local British force and was tasked with feeding misinformation to Turkish nationalists – a first taste of the activities that would define his later military career. In 1925, during another period of leave, Clarke covered the Rif War for the Morning Post.

Over the inter-war period, Clarke became involved in the theatre and drama establishments of his postings. In 1923, he re-formed the Royal Artillery Officers Dramatic Club and was responsible for the Royal Artillery's display at the 1925 Royal Tournament. In 1933 and 1934, he wrote and directed two Christmas pantomimes.

=== Palestine ===
In 1936, Clarke was posted, at his request, to Palestine, just in time to participate in the 1936 Arab uprising. The British presence in Jerusalem was minimal at that time, comprising two battalions of infantry and a motley collection of air and armour under the command of Colonel Jack Evetts. Clarke, as one of only two staff officers, was faced with organising an effective response to guerrilla warfare. He first set to work improving communications between the small Royal Air Force contingent and the army. It was here that he met Tony Simonds, an intelligence officer sent to the region with express orders to set up an intelligence network. Clarke and Simonds worked to feed reliable information to British forces.

Toward the end of 1936, more troops were dispatched to Palestine. Lieutenant-General John Dill was placed in command, and Clarke became his chief of staff. In 1937, Dill was replaced by Major-General Archibald Wavell, the commander who would later give Clarke free rein in Middle Eastern deception operations. In the preface to Clarke's 1948 book, Seven Assignments, Wavell wrote about their time together in Palestine:

When I commanded in Palestine in 1937–38, I had on my staff two officers in whom I recognised an original, unorthodox outlook on soldiering ... One was Orde Wingate, the second was Dudley Clarke.

— Wavell

== Second World War ==
The Commando shoulder patch during the Second World War

At the outbreak of the Second World War, Clarke was promoted to lieutenant-colonel and began working on intelligence tasks. He worked with Wavell in the Middle East to research possible Allied supply lines, undertook two trips to Norway (in an effort to maintain its neutrality), and conducted secret missions in Calais and Ireland.

In May 1940 Clarke became a military assistant to Sir John Dill, now a full general and Chief of the General Staff, at the War Office. On 30 May 1940, inspired by childhood recollections of similar Boer forces as well as experiences during the Arab uprising in Palestine, Clarke sketched out an idea for small amphibious raiding parties, called Commandos. On 5 June, while Dill was inspecting the troops evacuated from Dunkirk, Clarke suggested the idea to him, and the prime minister approved the plan on the following day. Clarke, under Brigadier Otto Lunde, was tasked with setting up a new department, MO9, and began to recruit soldiers for what would later become the British Commandos.

The first raid into France, Operation Collar, took place on 24 June 1940. Clarke obtained permission to accompany the 120-strong force, but was not allowed to go ashore. The attempt was not a major success, with only one of the four units managing to kill enemy troops. While waiting on the beach for his men to return, Clarke's boat was apparently spotted by a German patrol. Somehow Clarke was injured in the ear during, he said, an exchange of fire. Ernest Chappell, who was also on the beach, said that the patrol had not opened fire.

=== 1941: Cairo ===
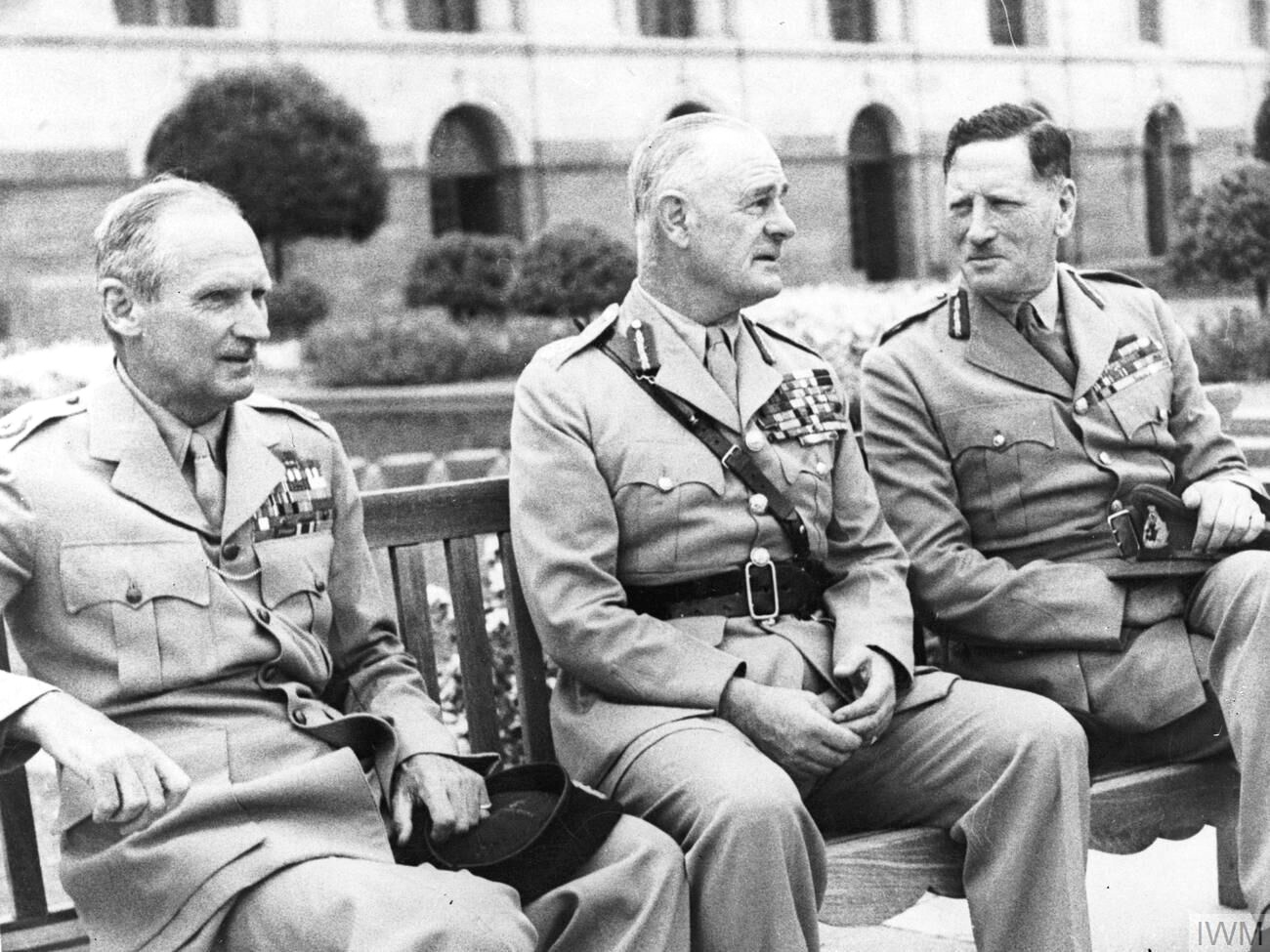
At various times in Cairo, Clarke worked alongside Montgomery, Wavell and Auchinleck.

In Cairo, Archibald Wavell, Clarke's old commander in Palestine, was commanding the North African campaign. He believed that deception was a key part of warfare. On 13 December he summoned Clarke to Egypt, telling high command he wished to set up "a special section of Intelligence for Deception". While awaiting Clarke's arrival, Wavell initiated a successful deception against the Italian forces at Sidi Barrani. Clarke reached Cairo on 18 December, to be greeted by Tony Simonds – another old hand from Palestine. Wavell put Clarke in charge, albeit under great secrecy, of broad strategic deception operations in North Africa. He held this position, under subsequent Mediterranean commanders, for the next five years.

On his arrival in Cairo, Clarke began to build a network of useful contacts. He befriended Lieutenant-Colonel Raymund Maunsell, who operated Security Intelligence Middle East (SIME), the agency in charge of counter-espionage in the region. Maunsell later worked closely with Clarke, helping to feed misinformation to the enemy via double agents. Clarke's first deception was a scheme to mislead Italian forces into expecting an invasion of Italian Somaliland instead of Eritrea, the real Allied target. Operation Camilla fooled the Italian leadership completely but instead of diverting troops as the British hoped, they withdrew their forces into Eritrea. From this failure Clarke learned a first lesson, one he would teach to many other deception officers during the war: that the key to deception was not to make your enemy think what you wish but to get them to do what you want.

Clarke had not forgotten his previous pet scheme: the Commandos. In January 1941, he met the American Colonel William J. Donovan while the latter was touring the region. Clarke's description of the 1940 British unit inspired Donovan to emulate the idea. Clarke suggested the name "Rangers", after the frontier force Rogers' Rangers in the film Northwest Passage, for Donovan's unit. In May of the following year the United States Army Rangers were founded.

In February, Clarke suffered from an attack of jaundice that put him out of action for about six weeks. He was visited regularly by Maunsell who was, by that time, a firm friend.

==== 'A' Force ====
At first Clarke worked alone and in secret, under the official title "Intelligence Officer (special duties) to the Commander-in-Chief". He had neither staff nor official mandate, and worked from a "converted bathroom" at the British Army headquarters, Cairo. His cover role was to establish a regional department for MI9, the less secret organisation tasked with helping Allied servicemen in escape and evasion tactics. Far from being a token cover, Clarke ran MI9's Middle East department, in tandem with his deception work, until August 1944. Clarke's one-man show in deception was not to last long.

In January 1941 Clarke began Operation Abeam, fabricating the existence of a British paratrooper regiment in the region. It would be two years before such troops reached the Mediterranean, but Clarke hoped to play on Italian fears of an airborne assault. He created a fictional 1st Special Air Service Brigade, using faked documents, photographs and reports, which leaked back to the Italians. He dressed two soldiers in "1 SAS" uniforms and set them to wander around Cairo, Port Said and Alexandria hinting at missions in Crete or Libya.

By March, Clarke had another scheme in the works, a deception cover for Operation Cordite, the 6th Infantry Division invasion of the Greek island Rhodes. His work interviewing locals about the island could not be associated with the 6th so he adopted the guise of 'A' Force. The name was intentionally vague, designed to add to the mythology of his fictional airborne unit. Although at first only a cover name, the department soon became real and took control of deception in the region. On 28 March 1941 Clarke requisitioned No. 6 Sharia Kasr-el-Nill, Cairo – opposite 6th Division HQ and below a brothel – and in April received an official mandate for his department. "Advanced Headquarters 'A' Force" moved into their new offices on 8 April 1941 and Clarke began to recruit his staff.

Naming of the SAS

The name SAS came mainly from the fact I was anxious to get the full co-operation of a very ingenious individual called Dudley Clark[e], who was responsible for running a deception operation in Cairo ... Clark[e] was quite an influential chap and promised to give me all the help he could if I would use the name of his bogus brigade of parachutists, which is the Special Air Service, the SAS

— David Stirling, 1985

Clarke's airborne SAS had another legacy. In May 1941 David Stirling, an injured member of the early 8 Commando, envisioned a new special forces unit consisting of small commando teams intended to operate behind enemy lines. Clarke gave the project his full backing, and the unit was named "L" Detachment, Special Air Service – in part to help solidify the existence of the larger fictional force in the minds of the enemy. Stirling's force later evolved into the modern-day Special Air Service. Clarke therefore had a hand in the formation of three famed military units.

Phantom forces, of which the SAS was only Clarke's first, played a crucial part in deception operations during the war – including along the Western Front in 1944 – but for the rest of April 1941 he worked hard to build his department.

==== Consolidating deception ====
Clarke's "War Establishment" granted him three officers, several enlisted men and a small array of vehicles. A recruitment drive paid off in the form of highly experienced staff. To help with visual deception he brought in Victor Jones and Jasper Maskelyne. He also recruited a Scots Guards officer, Captain Ogilvie-Grant, to manage the MI9 escape and evasion work, which had been adopted as cover for the whole of 'A' Force. Finally, the services of Major E. Titterington, originally a member of Maunsell's SIME, were obtained for help in creating forged documents; eventually Titterington's operation expanded to form a subsection of 'A' Force devoted to forgeries.

With his office organised, Clarke was happy to leave day-to-day management to his staff. He then embarked on a trip to Turkey, where he worked to establish a network of misinformation as well as carry out his MI9 role. There he met two important figures in Turkish intelligence – Brigadier Allan Arnold, the British military attaché, and Commander Vladimir Wolfson, a Royal Navy attaché – and worked with them to open channels of misinformation to the enemy. In Wolfson, Clarke had found an important resource and, in his own words, began "a long and profitable partnership for Deception and MI9 matters in Turkey which was to last for the rest of the war". Clarke left Istanbul on 16 May, travelling covertly back to Egypt via Syria and Lebanon in order to reconnoitre the ground that British forces would have to invade when entering the country. He arrived in Cairo on 21 May.

Despite Clarke and Wavell's successes in deception, the North African campaign was turning against the Allies. Germany had reinforced their Italian allies and in 1941 Erwin Rommel had taken command of Axis forces and won early victories. Churchill replaced Wavell with Claude Auchinleck. Clarke's new commander was impressed with Wavell's setup, so 'A' Force and the rest of Middle Eastern Command continued to operate as before.

==== Lisbon and London ====
Clarke travelled to Lisbon on 22 August 1941 aiming, as with his earlier Turkey trip, to open up lines of deception into Axis forces. He spent around a month in the area, posing as a flamboyant journalist, before being summoned back to London. His successful deception activities in the Middle East had caught the attention of high command, and Clarke was asked to write a paper about his experiences.

While in London, Clarke met many of his counterparts on the Western Front. He attended meetings of the Twenty Committee and Chiefs of Staff Committee (which was chaired by his old commander, John Dill). The paper on deception met with approval in the establishment and it was decided that a department similar to 'A' Force should be created in London. Clarke was offered the job, reporting directly to the Chiefs of Staff and the War Cabinet. He declined, citing loyalty to the Middle East, but his decision was in large part due to the greater operational freedom and status he enjoyed in North Africa. The London Controlling Section was formed and, after some disorganisation, prospered under John Bevan, with whom Clarke would later work closely.

The infamous photograph of Dudley Clarke wearing a dress which circulated among the Allied high command in late 1941

Pleased with his success in London, Clarke returned to Lisbon on 12 October posing as a journalist for The Times named "Wrangal Craker". His aim was to carry on the semi-undercover work of spreading rumours and misinformation to the Germans. Later that month, in Madrid, he was arrested while dressed as a woman. Guy Liddell, wartime counter-espionage head at MI5, said of the incident: "I'm afraid to say that after his stay in Lisbon as a bogus journalist he has got rather over-confident about his powers as an agent." Clarke was released, apparently at the behest of a German contact who believed him to be "an important agent who was ready to assist the Germans", and made his way to Gibraltar.

Clarke's run of bad luck continued. He was ordered back to London to explain the Madrid incident to his superiors but the ship he was on, the Ariosto, was torpedoed by a U-boat on 24 October. The Ariosto was one of three ships sunk in the engagement, although he escaped harm and returned to Gibraltar. Rather than attempting another trip to London, Clarke was interviewed by the Governor of Gibraltar, Lord Gort, who judged Clarke's answers acceptable and concluded that "we can reasonably expect that this escapade and its consequences will have given him sufficient shock to make him more prudent in the immediate future".

It is unclear why Clarke was wearing a dress, but reports of the incident indicated he had been following a lead and gone a little too far in his spy-craft. Photographs of his disguise, obtained from the Spanish police, circulated in London and were viewed mostly with amusement. He was allowed to return to Cairo and reached Egypt on 18 November. Although he escaped disciplinary action over the incident, it was the last time Clarke attempted his own espionage work.

=== 1942: El Alamein ===
Back in Cairo, Clarke discovered that much had changed during his absence. The recently promoted Colonel Ralph Bagnold had been appointed "Chief Deception Officer" at Middle Eastern HQ and had taken charge of tactical deception. Clarke was annoyed at what he saw as a power grab and at the sudden high profile of deception operations (Bagnold's promotion was widely publicised). Over the next few months Bagnold secured more and more of the day-to-day management of deception operations leaving 'A' Force, and Clarke, in a training and advisory capacity.

Despite this, Clarke's services were in high demand as the opening months of 1942 saw Allied forces in North Africa suffering serious defeats. On 2 February Auchinleck dispatched Clarke to Libya with urgent orders to assist in halting the German advances. Before leaving for the Eighth Army headquarters in Gazala, Clarke left a note, which he later described as "begging for the whole question of deception machinery in the Command to be reviewed completely afresh during his absence." Once on the ground he found a shaken army conducting a hesitant withdrawal, and in urgent need of delaying tactics to slow the German advance. After brainstorming with his team in Cairo, Clarke envisioned Bastion, a deception operation to convince Rommel that his advance on Gazala was heading into a trap. The plan, which involved Victor Jones creating a strong fictional force of 300 tanks on the British right hand flank, was in full swing during February. The operation appears to have had limited effect. Rommel delayed his advance until May, when British forces were routed at the Battle of Gazala and the Germans resumed their push toward Egypt.

Upon his return to Cairo, on 15 February, Clarke was pleased to find that Auchinleck had restored 'A' Force as the sole deception organisation at HQ. Bagnold's enterprise was entirely sidelined and he moved on to other things. Clarke, who in March was promoted to full colonel, said that Bastion had taught him much: "We learnt more Lessons from it than from almost any other plan and it helped us evolve three important principles." By the end of March, Clarke considered the much-expanded 'A' Force, and his theory of deception, to have matured beyond the basic trial and error of the previous years.

==== Operation Cascade ====
In March 1942 Clarke had begun to draft ideas for an ambitious order-of-battle deception. He had found that the process of convincing the enemy of the existence of a notional force was long and tedious. Operation Cascade was intended to create the fiction of a much increased Allied force in North Africa, including eight divisions, three new brigades, and even the 1st SAS. At first the plan was intended to deter the Axis from extending an offensive against the USSR southward into the region.

After a slow start, in early 1942, Cascade began to take effect. As early as May, Axis intelligence began to overestimate Allied strength by nearly 30%. In July the operation expanded. Clarke introduced more and more fictitious divisions and by the end of the year the Germans had accepted many of them as real formations. By 1944, when the operation was superseded, it had completely fooled the enemy. Cascade was a major success for Clarke; it supported most of the subsequent major deceptions for the remainder of the war (by providing established fictional units) and proved that deception on a grand scale was a realistic strategy.

==== El Alamein deceptions, August 1942 ====
In May, before Cascade had become fully operational, Rommel defeated the British Army in Libya. Auchinleck rallied his forces at El Alamein and asked Clarke to draft plans for delaying the Axis advance, giving the Allies time to withdraw. Operation Sentinel was designed to convince Rommel, using camouflage, fakery and radio deception, that substantial British armour sat between him and the retreating Eighth Army. In spite of his success at El Alamein Auchinleck was replaced by Harold Alexander on 8 August, Clarke's third commander in under two years. Bernard Montgomery was handed control of the Eighth Army and instructed to push Rommel back. Montgomery knew Clarke, having taught him infantry tactics at the Staff College in 1931, and instructed him to prepare deception plans for the Second Battle of El Alamein. The plan involved major camouflage activity, Operation Bertram, radio deception, Operation Canwell, and a disinformation campaign, Operation Treatment. On 9 September Clarke was appointed an Officer of the Order of the British Empire (OBE). The citation recognised his efforts in setting up A-Force, but referred to its less clandestine MI9 escape and evasion work.

Clarke had his mind on other things besides awards and El Alamein. He delegated much of the ongoing planning to 'A' Force staff, as the department was now well established. Instead he flew to London and Washington in October to discuss strategic deception for Operation Torch, the forthcoming British-American invasion of the French North African colonies, leaving Charles Richardson (a planning officer at Eight Army HQ) and Geoffrey Barkas (Director of Camouflage, Middle East Command) to implement Operation Bertram. For the first time deception experts from across the theatres of war worked together. John Bevan of the London Controlling Section hosted an October conference for Clarke, Peter Fleming from India, and representatives from Washington. The meeting agreed on plans for a disinformation campaign, which would attempt to convince German high command that the Allied targets in Africa were Dakar and Sicily (the far eastern and western limits of the theatre). Four days after Montgomery's success at El Alamein, on 8 November, Allied forces landed in Morocco and Algeria to the surprise of German forces there. On 14 October Clarke, along with Bevan and Flemming, met Churchill to discuss all the Allied deception strategies.

=== 1943: Barclay ===
1943 would be the peak of deception operations for Clarke and 'A' Force – in 1944 the focus switched to the Western Front. Until then he was very busy between Operation Barclay and the continuing Cascade. The main Allied push that year was toward Sicily, as decided by high command in January. Barclay was the elaborate deception with which Clarke was tasked, an operation to mislead the Axis into expecting attacks on the far eastern and western extremities of the northern Mediterranean theatre – namely the Balkan Peninsula and southern France.

On 15 March Clarke again met Bevan, in Algiers, to discuss strategy for Barclay. Building on Cascade he added the Twelfth Army to his fictional order of battle, and began to make them look like a convincing threat to Crete and the Greek mainland. For this new deception 'A' Force had strong support from London – in April the famed Operation Mincemeat was used to help bolster Clarke's deceptive thrust toward Crete.

By this point 'A' Force had much expanded beyond the small flat in Cairo, adding representatives with the army in Sicily and offices in Algiers and Nairobi. Clarke roved around the region acting as overseer of the department's operations. On 14 October he was appointed Commander of the Order of the British Empire (CBE), the citation (marked "not for publication") praised Clarke's ongoing work, referring to him as "irreplaceable". In December 1943, he was promoted to the rank of brigadier. Although the promotion did not include perks associated with higher ranks (such as a car and driver) Clarke used his charisma to obtain them anyway.

=== 1944: Monty's double ===
In 1944 the Allies finally focused on France and the Western Front. Bevan and the London Controlling Section were tasked with inventing an elaborate masquerade to cover the Normandy invasion, a vindication of the theory pioneered by Clarke and Wavell: that every real operation should have a complementary deception.

The focus on France left Clarke supporting the Allied push through Italy. He noted that "the peculiar circumstances of the Mediterranean Theater made it a sheer impossibility to have a hiatus of more than a week or two duration between Deception Plans." In quick succession 'A' Force executed deceptions that included the operations Oakenfield and Zeppelin. Later that spring Clarke was inspired by a war film, Five Graves to Cairo, to create Operation Copperhead. Bernard Montgomery had recently been moved to England to take command of the ground forces intended for the Normandy invasion. To confuse the Germans, Clarke located a look-alike, pre-war actor Lieutenant M. E. Clifton James, and brought him to the Mediterranean under much ceremony.

Through 1944 'A' Force was slowly winding down. Clarke was involved in planning Operation Bodyguard, a major cover plan for the Allied landing in Normandy, and he was tasked with executing the (largely political) deceptions in the Middle Eastern region. However, by the end of the summer 'A' Force's usefulness in operations had reached its end. On 13 October Clarke held a party at a Cairo cinema for the remaining members of the department. Command of the remaining tactical deceptions was transferred to Caserta. Clarke, along with a skeleton staff, remained in Egypt to tie up the loose ends of various operations and to begin his history of the department. In April 1945, Clarke left Cairo for London; on 18 June he called a meeting of the remaining 'A' Force members at the Great Central Hotel where the department was disbanded.

Clarke was mentioned in despatches on 19 October 1944, relating to his work setting up 'A' Force.

The planning and implementation of deception measures which have played a major part in the successes achieved in this theatre have been due in large measure to the originality of thought, imagination and initiative displayed by this officer.

— Mention in Despatches (1944)

The citation was announced in The London Gazette on 22 February 1945. Clarke received a further honour that year, when on 19 June he was appointed a Companion of the Order of the Bath (CB). On 2 April 1946 he was awarded the American Legion of Merit.

== After the war ==
Following the end of the war Clarke spent some time writing war histories. Until his retirement from the army in 1947, with the rank of brigadier, he recorded the history of 'A' Force. The document was never published and remained classified till the 1970s. His first complete book was published in 1948. Seven Assignments recorded Clarke's activities during the early wartime period of 1939 and 1940 (before the Middle East posting). It was not his first attempt at a book. In 1925 Clarke had found a publisher for his coverage for the Rif rebellion, but the work was never finished.

Following Seven Assignments Clarke then took a job at Conservative Central Office as Head of Public Opinion Research, where he worked until 1952. During this later career he also served as a director of Securicor. In 1952 he resumed his literary career with the publication of The Eleventh at War, a history of the 11th Hussars. The following year he submitted a publisher's proposal for The Secret War, a full account of deception during the Second World War, but was prevented from writing it by the Official Secrets Act. His final book was fiction, a thriller entitled Golden Arrow, published in 1955.

Clarke lived out his retirement in relative obscurity, despite the belief of his former commander, Field Marshal Harold Alexander, that "he did as much to win the war as any other single officer". Clarke died on 7 May 1974; his address at the time was an apartment in Raleigh House, Dolphin Square, London. Most of his war work in military deception remained an obscure secret until the end of the 20th century and the publication of Michael Howard's 1990 official history, Strategic Deception in the Second World War.

== Legacy ==
Clarke's Principles of Deception

- Induce the enemy to do something, not just to think something.
- Never conduct a deception without any clear objective.
- Any proper deception plan must have time to work.

Clarke was widely regarded as an expert in military deception, and viewed by some of his peers as nearly legendary in status. In his 2004 book, The Deceivers, historian Thaddeus Holt identifies Clarke as "the master of the game", having been immersed in his deception activities for the entire war. Clarke evolved deception, almost from scratch, as a vital part of Allied strategy. The organisation that he and Wavell established proved a model for the other theatres of war, and his successes directly led to the creation of the London Controlling Section in 1941. He also misled German intelligence for several years – to the extent that they overestimated Allied strength in North Africa by a quarter of a million men. The journalist Nicholas Rankin, writing in 2008, referred to Clarke as "the greatest British deceiver of WW2, a special kind of secret servant."

From the start of his Cairo posting Clarke learned the art of deception by trial and error. From mistakes during Camilla he learned to focus on what he wanted the enemy to do rather than on what he wanted them to think. From another early operation (K-Shell, the spreading of rumours about a new Allied super-shell which eventually petered out after the media picked up the story), he learned the value of conducting deception only when there was a clear objective, rather than because it was possible. From Bastion he discovered the difficulty of running a large deception on a short timescale. From these lessons Clarke evolved his principles of deception.

At the Tehran Conference Winston Churchill made his famous remark that in wartime 'truth is so precious that she should always be attended by a bodyguard of lies.' Clarke's principle was the opposite. His thesis was that the lie was so precious that it should be flanked with an escort of truths.

Clarke also had a good appreciation of the complex interplay between Operations and intelligence in deception operations. He understood how to manipulate enemy intelligence agencies to build up the story he was trying to sell, and saw the importance of getting Operations, on his own side, to fit into those stories.

He was depicted by Dominic West in the 2022 television historical drama SAS: Rogue Heroes.

== Personal life ==
Clarke is described as a charismatic, charming and theatrical character with a streak of creativity, a personality reflected in the escapades of his life and career. His self-deprecating humour and work ethic made Clarke a popular figure within the army, where he was considered to have odd "old world" habits and "an uncanny habit of suddenly appearing in a room without anyone having noticed him enter". Clarke was considered to possess an "original intellect", and to have odd habits, but was never seen as eccentric (a trait that was frowned on within the army establishment). Despite having middle-class origins, he aspired to the fringes of the upper-class establishment, in his words: "one of those in the inner circle, watching the wheels go round at the hub of the British Empire at some great moment in history."

Now, I don't think I shall ever return [to Egypt], but in my heart of hearts I still wish it well, for I have found much happiness there.

— Dudley Clarke

From his time in Egypt during the First World War, Clarke fell in love with the country and he returned there as often as possible. He had a great respect for the inhabitants, writing that they had "the endearing qualities of humour and fortitude". Another particular love was film. In Cairo, during the Second World War, he was a regular at the cinema, a location that suited his photographic memory and preference for working at night; he often conducted meetings there. Films influenced his work in other ways, for instance in the inspiration he took from Northwest Passage to name the US Rangers.

Clarke was inventive as well as frugal. While at flight school in Reading, and without any money to fund his recreation, he recalled building "an apparatus composed of a bootlace, a lanyard and some straps off my valise, by which I am enabled to turn out the light without getting out of bed".

The incident in Madrid, and Clarke's love of theatrics, raised questions about his sexuality. His arrest was somewhat hushed up at the time, which may have raised more questions than it prevented. There is no indication that Clarke was homosexual. He was involved in two bad relationships with women. In 1922 he met a Slavic woman called Nina in Wiesbaden, but she disappeared after Clarke smuggled currency to her friend in Bulgaria. Then in the late 1920s a woman in Sussex, who "meant everything in the world" to him, refused an offer of marriage. He often claimed to hate children and never married. Despite this Clarke was known for having beautiful female acquaintances, to whom his friends referred as "Dudley's Duchesses".

== Books ==
- Clarke, Dudley (1948). Seven Assignments. J. Cape.
- Clarke, Dudley (1952). The Eleventh at War: Being the Story of the XIth Hussars (Prince Albert's Own) Through the Years 1934–1945. M. Joseph.
- Clarke, Dudley (1955). Golden Arrow.
