= Operation Zeppelin (deception plan) =

1944 Allied military deception during World War II

- Part of Operation Bodyguard
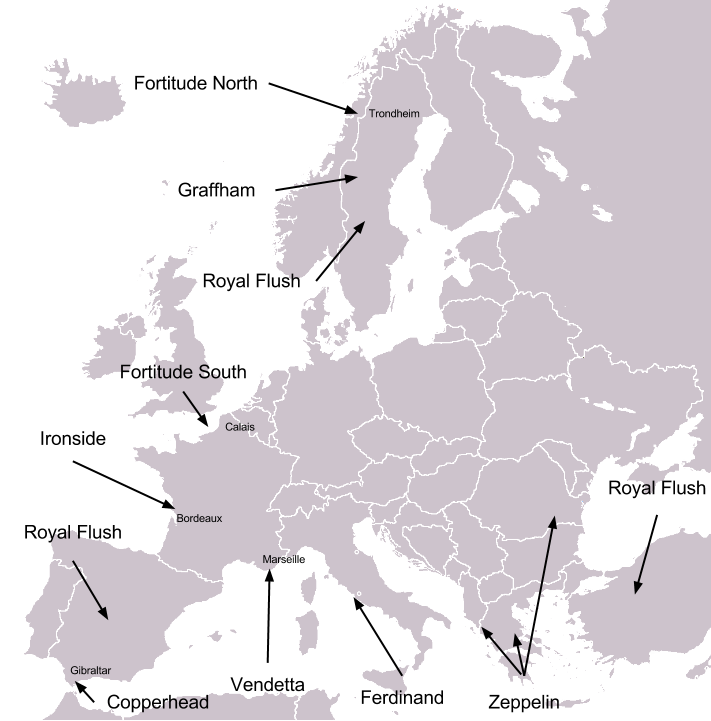
- Zeppelin formed part of Operation Bodyguard, a Europe-wide deception strategy for 1944
- Operational scope: Strategic
- Type: Military deception
- Planned: 1944
- Planned by: 'A' Force
- Objective: German belief in an amphibious invasion of the Eastern Mediterranean and Southern France.
- Outcome: May have contributed to German forces remaining in the Mediterranean until mid-1944

Operation Zeppelin (along with its follow-up subsidiaries, Vendetta and Turpitude) was a major military deception operation run by the British during the Second World War. It formed part of Operation Bodyguard, the cover plan for the invasion of Normandy in 1944, and was intended to mislead German intelligence as to the Allied invasion plans in the Mediterranean theatre that year. The operation was planned by 'A' Force and implemented by means of visual deception and misinformation.

Zeppelin was executed in five phases between February and July 1944. The story behind each stage developed various invasion threats against Greece, Albania, Croatia, Turkey, Bulgaria and France. The last portions of the operation received their own codenames. Vendetta referred to a threat toward Southern France close to D-Day, and Turpitude was the codename for the final stage of Zeppelin, an overland threat to Greece and Bulgaria.

It is unclear how much impact Zeppelin had on German response in the region, but the aims of the deception were achieved by tying up German defensive forces in the Mediterranean beyond D-Day. Post-war analysis of German intelligence documents indicated that they had overstated Allied forces, as had been intended. However, the German high command did not come to expect a major invasion in the Balkans.

== Background ==
In preparation for the 1944 invasion of Normandy, the Allied nations conducted a complex series of deceptions under the codename Bodyguard. This was a large strategic plan with the aim of misleading the German high command as to Allied intentions in 1944. While the main focus of Bodyguard was on the invasion of Western France, additional plans supported operations in the Mediterranean and Scandinavia.

In 1941, 'A' Force (the Cairo-based department responsible for deception operations in North Africa) had begun an operation, codenamed Cascade, to inflate the number of troops in the region by creating fictional divisions. By 1943 the use of notional formations had proved a useful part of deception operations, such as Operation Rayon, and the practice formed the basis for key parts of Bodyguard. The Allies invaded Italy in September 1943 and by the end of the year had occupied most of the south of the country. Thirty-eight divisions were deployed across the Mediterranean theatre, mostly in Italy with some in North Africa.

The various deceptions to fulfil the Mediterranean portion of Bodyguard were given the codename Zeppelin, with follow-up subsidiaries called Vendetta and Turpitude. Its initial overall aims were to tie down German defensive forces in the region but without suggesting too great a threat to Southern France until the Allies had decided whether or not to conduct landings there.

Planning for the operation was begun by 'A' Force in January 1944. The deception required an increase in the fictional troops that Operation Cascade had created. Operation Wantage succeeded from Cascade on 6 February with the aim over inflating Allied troops by thirty percent.

== Operation ==
"Once we have entered the month of June all considerations regarding the safety of our channels (outside of italy) are to be subordinated to the demands of the plan

— Dudley Clarke, Message to Double Agent handlers

Zeppelin and its constituent plans, Vendetta and Turpitude, focused on tying down German resources in southern France and the Balkans. Its aim was, during early 1944, to distract attention from a potential Allied invasion of southern France (Operation Dragoon) by creating a fictional threat against Crete and Croatia. It also intended to tie up troops in the Eastern Mediterranean so that they would not be redeployed to France during the Allied campaign. Zeppelin's "story" would be that the notional British Twelfth Army were preparing for an amphibious landing, from North Africa into The Balkans, supported by a Soviet overland invasion into Albania and Polish forces staged out of Italy.

Zeppelin was put across through various means. Double agents relayed messages about troop movements, dummy formations and radio traffic were created and searches were conducted for local guides and maps, as would be made in preparation for a real invasion. Nearly 600 messages were sent through agents, who were used extensively and at considerable risk of exposure. Dummy formations were created in Italy and Libya, Colonel Victor Jones began depicting both an Armoured and Airborne divisions near Tobruk for the first stage of the operation.

The first stage of Zeppelin commenced on 8 February, with threats to Greece and Crete. A provisional date for the supposed invasion was set at 29 March (to take advantage of the full moon). On 10 March, the operation moved to a second stage, where the fictional operation was delayed until April and May to join up with a supposed Soviet invasion of Bulgaria. The second stage was communicated through a subplan, called Dungloe, involving double agents back in England. The story passed to the Germans was that radio messages would inform friendly leaders in Yugoslavia of the intended invasion dates and any delays.

The third stage of Zeppelin involved a delay until 21 May on the basis that the Soviets had asked for them to be synchronised with their own invasion plans. That ran from 21 April until 9 May, when a major revision to the plans, the fourth stage, was introduced. The Twelfth Army and Polish forces would land in Albania and Croatia, bypassing Greece due to mutiny within Allied Greek forces in Africa, with an invasion set in June. A major invasion of southern France was also added, codenamed Vendetta.

=== Vendetta ===
US XXXI Corps (Phantom) SSI

The Allies had already decided to mount an invasion of southern France (Dragoon), which occurred in August 1944. Vendetta's story was agreed in the first week of May and deception work started on 9 May. Its aim was to detain German forces in Southern France for up to twenty five days following the Normandy landings. The plan threatened a landing near Sete (chosen for its distance from the Dragoon landing site) by the US Seventh Army, consisting of fictional US units including the XXXI US Corps under Major General Terry de la M. Allen and some French units. Allen was in Arizona and Colorado training the 104th Infantry Division, which would indeed invade France in September 1944. Vendetta was supported by a diplomatic deception, Operation Royal Flush, which requested support from the Spanish government to allow injured soldiers to be evacuated following an invasion.

For Vendetta, stores were stockpiled in Algerian ports and Allied troops were given maps for the supposed landing zones. A naval exercise, involving sixty ships, was run between 9 and 11 June which included embarking thousands of men and vehicles from the US 91st Infantry Division. On 11 June, the Algerian borders were closed, a natural precursor to invasion.

The deception could not be maintained for long. The British carriers Indomitable and Victorious, which had formed a key part of the naval deception, left for the Indian Ocean. Meanwhile, the 91st left to deploy in Italy. From 24 June, the Allies began to wind down Vendetta with the story that German forces remaining in southern France, rather than moving to Normandy, caused the invasion to be delayed.

=== Turpitude ===
The final phase of Zeppelin was codenamed Turpitude, the story for which was an overland invasion of Greece by British troops via Turkey and the Soviet Union via Bulgaria. It was planned in the most part by 'A' Force's Michael Crichton in Cairo. Deception efforts for Turpitude were focused in Syria, and around the ports of Tripoli and Lattakia. The Allies hoped to indicate a spoiling attack against the island of Rhodes before the main attack against Salonika. Turpitude finished on 26 June, and Zeppelin officially came to a close on 6 July 1944.

Turpitude was communicated through visual deceptions in Syria by all three armed forces. The RAF flew reconnaissance flights across the supposed targets, and the Navy set up major facilities in the Syrian coastal ports (anti-aircraft guns, searchlights and other efforts that might hide major activity). Along the Turkish border the British Ninth Army (the small force protecting Syria), the 31st Indian Armoured Division and 20th Armoured Division (a fictional division, really the dummy tanks of Jones' 24th Armoured Brigade) put on a show of readiness. Political deception, via Royal Flush, was also used to hint heavily at Allied actions in the region.

== Impact ==
The Allies considered Zeppelin to have achieved its main objective of tying down German forces in the region until after the invasion of Normandy, but they did not appear to convince the German high command that major Allied landings would occur in the Mediterranean. Instead, Zeppelin helped the Allies achieve their objective by convincing the Germans of the threat of small invasions and stopping them from removing the defensive forces. According to Jacob Field, the operation successfully detained 25 divisions in defensive positions in the region.

The operation affected German analysis of Allied troop strength. In early 1944 the Allies had 38 divisions in the region, but the German battle plan identified up to 71. Whether or not directly related to Zeppelin, German forces remained in the Mediterranean throughout May 1944 and so were not available to reinforce Normandy in June.

With Vendetta the Allies may have oversold the deception. Vendetta's various deceptions, coupled with political overtures in Spain (Operation Royal Flush), created what German intelligence called "wealth of alarming reports". However, they were assessed as deceptive in nature, probably from their volume. In mid-June, the German high command decided that although the Allies had enough troops in North Africa to effect an invasion they lacked the landing craft for actually undertakomg the operation. However, the reports had held enough credibility in late May and early June that, on the eve of the Normandy landings, German divisions were deploying in defensive positions along the southern coast. Troops did not begin moving north until June and July.

Turpitude had an impact in Turkey, with reports in early June of discussion within the country's political and military spheres. On 10 June, the German ambassador to Turkey reported that the government were concerned about the possibility of the Allies using the country as a staging ground. The ambassador's report, which included details of Allied military buildup in the area, was treated with scepticism by German high command who were unable to verify some of the information. However, the German intelligence apparatus issued warnings of probable Allied operations in the region and requested "exceptional vigilance" from forces stationed there.
