= Advanced Headquarters 'A' Force =

Allied WWII military deception planning group

Advanced Headquarters 'A' Force, generally referred to as 'A' Force, was a deception department during the Second World War. It was set up in March 1941 and based in Cairo under Brigadier Dudley Clarke. General Archibald Wavell, the commander of forces in North Africa at the outbreak of war, initiated the use of deception as part of Operation Compass, in December 1940. After the success of Compass, Wavell sent for Clarke, with whom he had earlier worked in Palestine. Clarke was charged with forming the first deception department, in secret with limited resources.

== Background ==
On 10 June 1940, Italy declared war on the Allied nations. The British Middle East Command, based in Egypt under General Archibald Wavell, fought a defensive war against Italian forces until Autumn, when it initiated more offensive manoeuvres.

In November Wavell planned an offensive, Operation Compass, against Italian troops at Sidi Barrani. As part of the operation he tried to deceive the enemy about the strength of British forces; via disinformation and visual deception. Compass, executed on 9 December, was a tactical success; something Wavell attributed to the accompanying deception. On 13 December he informed Allied high command of his intention to form a department to manage deception, and requested Dudley Clarke be sent to Cairo to help.

Clarke arrived in Egypt on 18 December and at first worked alone and in secret, under the official title "Intelligence Officer (special duties) to the Commander in Chief". He had neither staff nor official mandate, and worked from a "converted bathroom" at the British Army headquarters, Cairo. His cover role was to establish a regional department for MI9, the somewhat less secret organisation tasked with helping Allied servicemen in escape and evasion tactics. Far from being a token cover, Clarke ran MI9's Middle East department, in tandem with his deception work, until August 1944.

== 'A' Force ==
By 1941, Clarke began to work with others, specialists in specific deception arts. Major Victor Jones was an engineer with the 14th/20th King's Hussars who had organised several tactical deceptions using dummy tanks. Mark Ogilvie-Grant was a Captain in the Scots Guards, Clarke recruited him to help with the spreading of disinformation.

In January 1941 Clarke began fabricating the existence of a British paratrooper regiment in the region, Operation Abeam, based on intelligence recovered the previous December. An Italian officer's journal had somehow been acquired, in it the officer expressed fear of an airborne assault. It would be two years before Allied paratroopers were deployed to North Africa, but Clarke planned to enhance these fears by creating a fictional "Special Air Service Brigade". Major Jones created a fleet of dummy gliders and Clarke organised fake radio traffic and information leaks. He even dressed two soldiers in "1 SAS" uniforms and set them to wander around Cairo, Port Said and Alexandria hinting at missions in Crete or Libya.

By March, Clarke had another scheme in the works; a deception cover for Operation Cordite (the 6th Infantry Division invasion of Rhodes). His work interviewing locals about the Greek island could not be associated with the 6th so he adopted the guise of 'A' Force. The name was intentionally vague, designed to add to the mythology of his fictional airborne unit. Although at first only a cover name, the department would soon become real and take control of all deception in the region. On March 28, 1941 Clarke requisitioned No. 6 Sharia Kasr-el-Nill, Cairo – opposite 6th Division HQ and below a brothel – and in April received official mandate for his department. "Advanced Headquarters 'A' Force" moved into their new offices on 8 April 1941 and Clarke began to recruit his staff.

=== Struggles ===
With 'A' Force well established Clarke felt able to leave Cairo and pursue contacts outside of Egypt. He travelled to Turkey with the dual aim of establishing an MI9 presence in the country, and developing routes for 'A' Force to pass deceptive information to the enemy. Whilst abroad 'A' Force nominally fell under the control of Victor Jones.

In Clarke's absence, what he later regarded as a power struggle emerged at Middle East Command. In October, a recently promoted and rising-star Colonel Ralph Bagnold was appointed "Chief Deception Officer" for the region. Bagnold and his staff took over tactical deception, leaving 'A' Force to handle strategic planning. Upon his return to Cairo, Clarke was annoyed both at the perceived power grab and the publicity around Bagnold's promotion (Clarke having previously invested effort in keeping deception low profile). Over the next few months, however, Bagnold's department began to take control of most of the theatre's deception planning, leaving 'A' Force responsible for training and advisory capacity (although Jones retained a lot of control over physical deception).

== Legacy ==
'A' Force was an important step forward for Allied deception. Clarke's report in September 1941 was directly responsible for the creation of the London Controlling Section, Ops. (B) and the new focus on deceptive warfare through till the end of the war.

== Structure and personnel ==
'A' Force was officially an organisation under Middle Eastern Command (Cairo). As well as overseeing deception within the North African theatre it also represented MI9 (escape and evasion) in the region, as a cover role, which accounted for a good portion of its staff. The organisation expanded quickly from its founding, and by the end of the war had quite a large staff, some of the key individuals included;

Dudley Clarke	Founded 'A' Force and was its head until the end of the war.
Noel Wild	Recruited in 1942 as head of the Operations section, and Clarke's deputy. Wild was known for his stubbornness. Transferred to England in 1943 to head his own deception outfit (Ops (B) under SHAEF) and help plan Operation Bodyguard.
Victor Jones	Recruited for his knowledge of visual deception, particularly dummy tanks. Jones managed physical deception for Clarke, and was even the de facto head of 'A' Force for a short period in late 1941.
Jasper Maskelyn	A well-known stage magician. Clarke deliberately portrayed Maskelyne as the mastermind behind many of the 'A' Force's dummy machines and other physical deceptions. This lent credibility to the inventions within the chain of command, and helped distract attention from many of the department activities. In fact Maskelyne worked on evasion devices and gave lectures for the MI9 side of 'A' Force.
E. Titterington	A forger who produced all of the department's fake passports and other documents. He was also tasked with opening the diplomatic bags of neutral nations so that Clarke could read their contents, before sealing them back up again.
Mark Ogilvie-Grant	Helped with the information warfare and MI9 cover work.
