= R. Andrew Bassford =

United States Army general

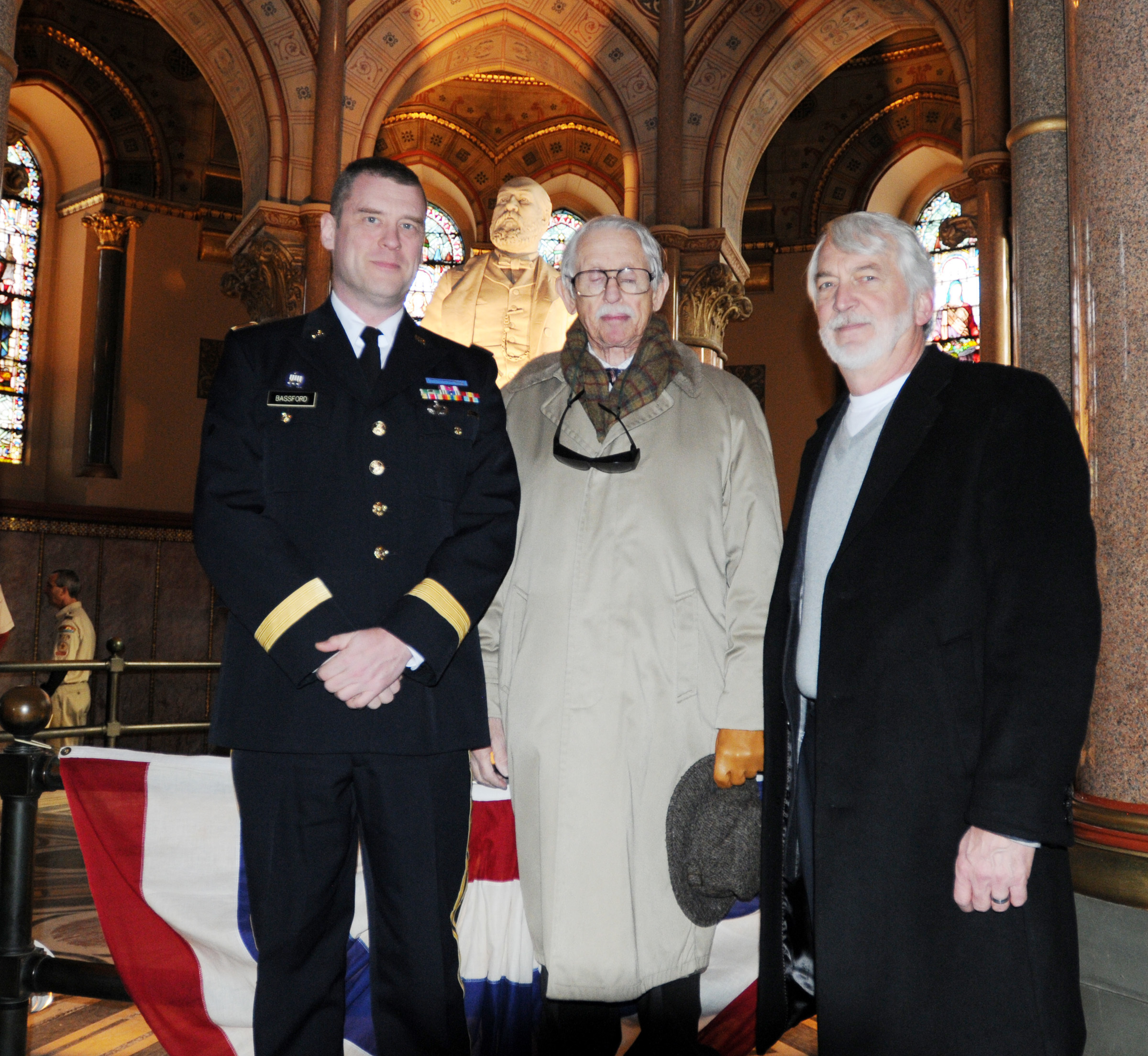
- Bassford with decedents of President Garfield in 2014
- Military career
- Allegiance: United States
- Branch: United States Army
- Service years: 1986-
- Rank: Brigadier General
- Awards: Meritorious Service Medal; Army Commendation Medal; Army Achievement Medal

R. Andrew Bassford is a brigadier general in the United States Army Reserve and Deputy Commander of the 88th Regional Support Command at Fort McCoy, Wisconsin.

== Career ==
Bassford originally joined the United States Army in 1986. The following year, he completed the Basic, Airborne and Ranger Courses at the United States Army Infantry School and was assigned to the 7th Infantry Division in Germany. Later, he joined the 325th Airborne Infantry Regiment.

In 1998, Bassford transferred to the Army Reserve and was assigned to the 80th Division. Later, he became a battalion commander with the 317th Infantry Regiment and a brigade commander with the 98th Division. In 2013, Bassford was Chief of Staff of the 108th Training Command (Initial Entry Training). He was promoted to the rank of brigadier general in 2014.

Awards he has received include the Meritorious Service Medal, the Army Commendation Medal and the Army Achievement Medal. In addition, he is authorized to wear the Ranger tab, the Senior Parachutist Badge and the Expert Infantryman Badge.

== Education ==
- Georgetown University
- University of Virginia School of Law
- United States Army Infantry School
- United States Army War College
- United States Army Jumpmaster School
- United States Army Command and General Staff College
