= 518th Regiment =

518th Regiment may refer to:

- 518th Fighter Aviation Regiment, Soviet Union
- 518th Infantry Regiment, United States
- 518th (Thames and Medway) Coast Regiment, Royal Artillery

== See also ==
- 518th (disambiguation)
