= A. Ray Royalty =

US Army general

A. Royalty
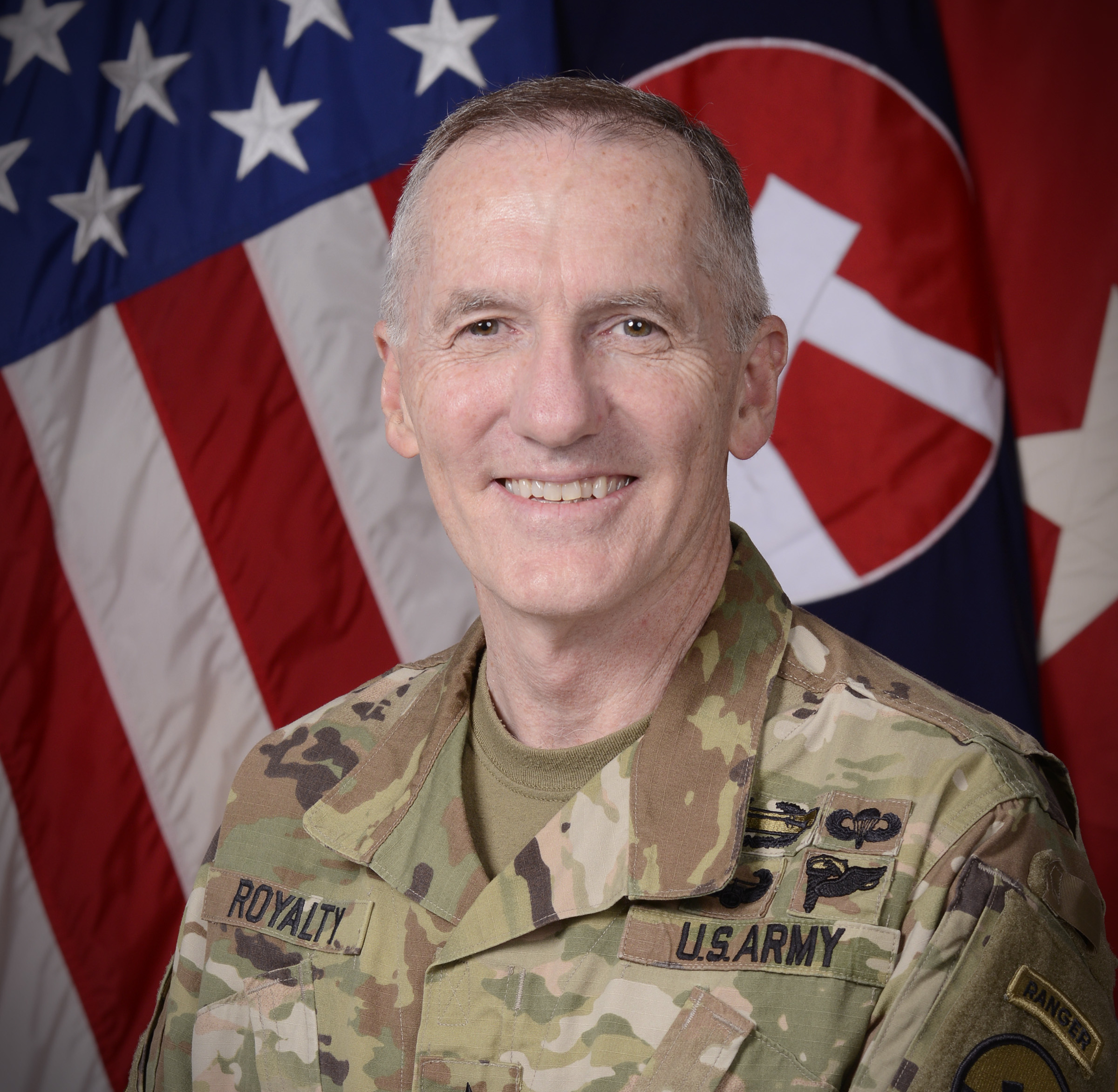
- Major General Royalty in July 2017
- Education: US Military Academy (BS); Webster University (MA); Winthrop University (MBA); Army War College (MSS); GW University (Doctorate)
- Children: 1
- Military career
- Branch: US Army Reserve
- Years: 1983–2020
- Rank: Major general
- Commands: 95th Training Division; 84th Training Command
- Conflicts: Iraq War surge of 2007

A. "Ray" Royalty is a retired major general of the United States Army Reserve.

== Personal life ==
A. "Ray" Royalty is the son of a Vietnam veteran (United States Army).

In 1983, Royalty received his Bachelor of Science from the United States Military Academy in West Point, New York. He later received a Master of Arts degree from Webster University, a Master of Business Administration from Winthrop University, a Master of Strategic Studies from the United States Army War College, and a doctorate in human and organizational learning from George Washington University.

As of August 2017, Royalty and his wife Teena had one daughter, Morgan (a graduate student at Boston University).

== US Army ==
Upon his graduation from the Academy, Royalty was commissioned into the Infantry Branch of the United States Army.

In the United States Army Reserve, Royalty was an aide-de-camp for the 94th Army Reserve Command at Hanscom Air Force Base, chief of staff for the 81st Regional Readiness Group at Fort Jackson, commander of the 98th Training Division's first brigade at Fort Benning, deputy chief of operations and deputy commanding general of the 108th Training Command in Charlotte, North Carolina, commanding general of the 95th Training Division at Fort Sill, and director of "G-34, Army Protection" at Department of the Army headquarters in Washington, D.C.

On active duty, Royalty served with the 5th Infantry Division, 75th Ranger Regiment, 10th Mountain Division, and The Pentagon. With the 1st Infantry Division, Royalty was a senior combat advisor during the Iraq War troop surge of 2007.

By August 2017, Royalty was a major general and commanding the 84th Training Command at Fort Knox. From September 2019 through October 2020, he was the deputy chief of staff for United States Army Training and Doctrine Command.

Royalty retired as a major general in October 2020 at Joint Base Langley–Eustis. Among his awards and decorations, he received a Parachutist Badge, Air Assault Badge, Pathfinder Badge, Ranger Tab, Combat Infantryman Badge, and Army Staff Identification Badge.
