= Ralph C. Smith =

United States Army general (1893–1998)

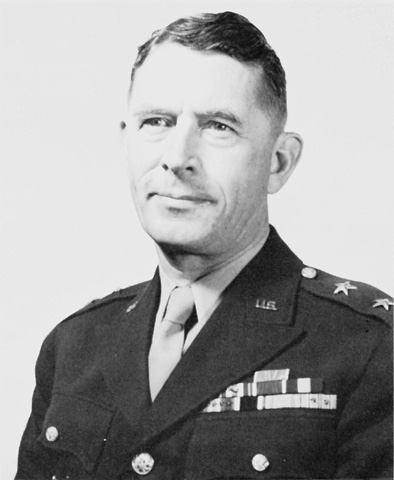
- Portrait of Smith in the 1940s
- Born: Ralph Corbett Smith; November 27, 1893; South Omaha, Nebraska, U.S.
- Died: January 21, 1998 (aged 104); Palo Alto, California, U.S.
- Military career
- Allegiance: United States
- Branch: United States Army
- Service years: 1916–1948
- Rank: Major General
- Unit: Infantry Branch
- Commands: 1st Battalion, 30th Infantry Regiment; 27th Infantry Division; 98th Infantry Division
- Conflicts: Pancho Villa Expedition; World War I; Meuse–Argonne offensive; World War II; Gilbert and Marshall Islands campaign; Battle of Saipan
- Awards: Silver Star (2); Legion of Merit; Purple Heart

Ralph Corbett Smith (November 27, 1893 – January 21, 1998) was a senior officer of the United States Army. After receiving early training as a pilot from Orville Wright he served Brigadier General John J. Pershing's army against Pancho Villa, was decorated for bravery in World War I and commanded the 27th Infantry Division in combat in the Pacific War in World War II. At his death Smith was the oldest surviving general officer of the Army.

== Early life ==
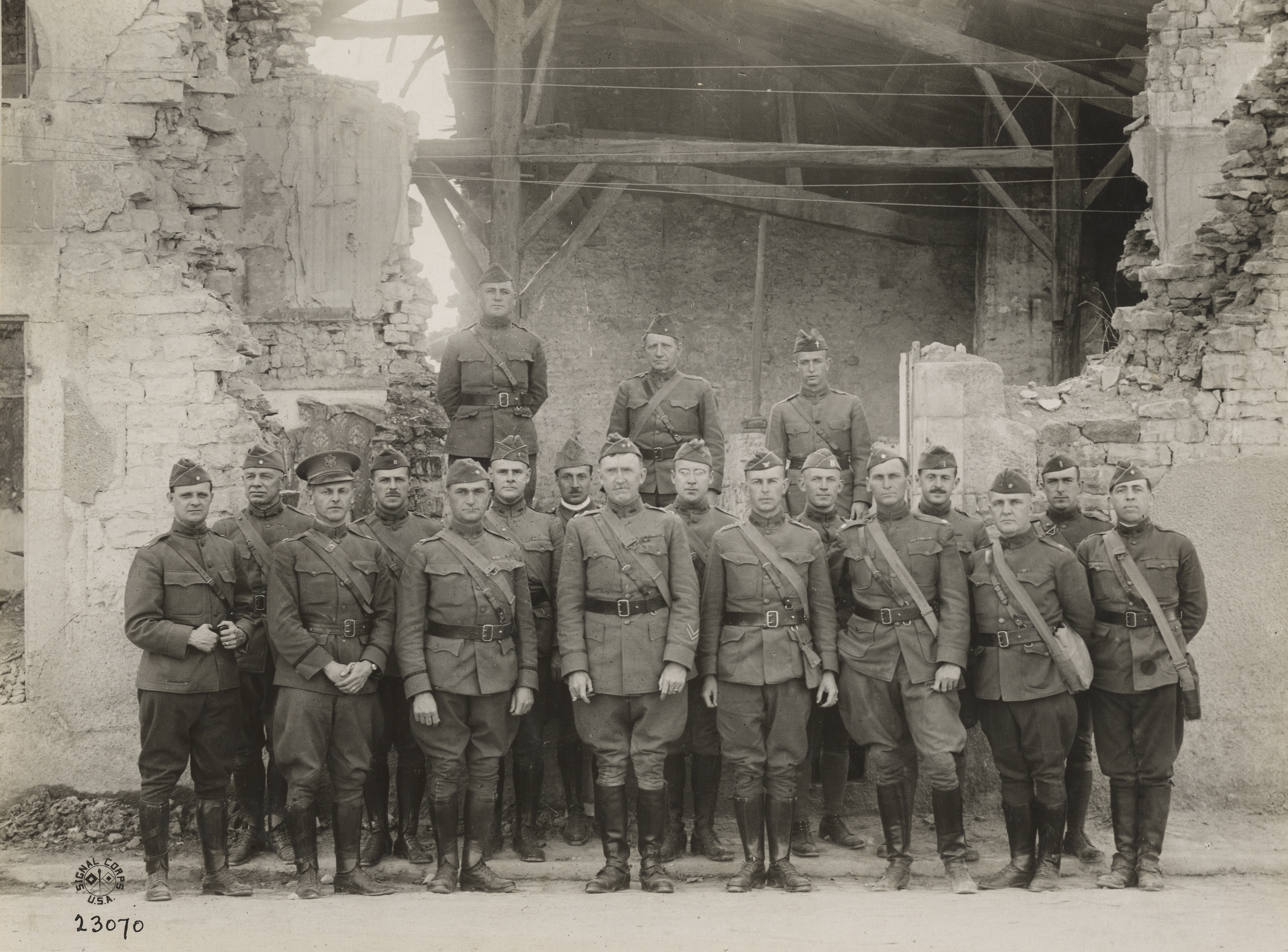
Major General John L. Hines, commanding the 4th Division, and members of his divisional staff at Haudainville, Meuse, France, September 15, 1918. Captain Ralph C. Smith, aide-de-camp to Major General Hines is located in the second row, third from the right.

Ralph Corbett Smith was born in Nebraska. He attended Colorado State College and served in the Colorado National Guard. He was an early aviator and was given flying lessons, as a young officer, by Orville Wright, and his pilot's license, signed by Wright, bore the number 13 because he was the 13th person to receive one.

He was commissioned as a second lieutenant into the Infantry Branch of the United States Army in 1916 and was involved in the army's unsuccessful Mexican Punitive Expedition, whose Commanding General (CG) was Brigadier General John J. Pershing, against Pancho Villa, just before the American entry into World War I in early April 1917.

During World War I, Smith was awarded the Silver Star with an oak leaf cluster for two instances of bravery while serving with the American Expeditionary Forces (AEF) on the Western Front. He was sent overseas with the 16th Infantry Regiment, part of the 1st Division, towards the end of 1917, later being transferred to the 4th Division. He was wounded in action in the Meuse–Argonne offensive in the latter half of 1918 and served in occupation duties in Germany after the war. He then studied at the university of Paris at the Sorbonne, and the École militaire.^{,}

Between the world wars his duties including teaching at the United States Military Academy and attending, and then instructing, at the Command and General Staff School at Fort Leavenworth, Kansas.

== World War II ==
Smith was a temporary colonel when the United States entered World War II in December 1941. In 1942, promoted to brigadier general, he served as an assistant division commander of the 76th Infantry Division, later becoming a major general and taking command of the 27th Infantry Division, the unit charged with the defense of the outer Hawaiian Islands.

In November 1943, the 27th Infantry Division was incorporated with the 2nd Marine Division to form the V Amphibious Corps for the purpose of invading and securing the Gilbert Islands in the Central Pacific. While the Marines took the major objective, Tarawa Atoll (Operation Galvanic), the Army was tasked with capturing Makin Atoll (Operation Kourbash) approx. 120 statute miles to the north. The corps commander, Marine Corps Lieutenant General Holland M. "Howlin' Mad" Smith, expected the Army's 6,500 men to be able to overwhelm the 800 Japanese defenders in a day. Furious upon being informed of a lack of progress, Holland Smith went to Makin to assess the situation: "When he arrived at Ralph Smith's HQ he was told that there was heavy fighting in progress in the north of the island. Commandeering a jeep, he drove to the scene of the 'battle' and found it, in his words, 'As quiet as Wall Street on a Sunday.'" When Army leaders looked into Holland Smith's claim, they found he was not at the front line, but miles behind it. The "infantry soldiers" that Holland Smith thought he was berating for their complacency were actually supply soldiers offloading cargo. The Marine general then lectured junior Army officers on Makin about the superiority of the Marine Corps over the Army. This incident was the catalyst for a serious breakdown in relations between the Marines and the Army that continued until well after the war." Ralph Smith reported that enemy resistance had been defeated and the island was ready to be turned over to the garrison force four days after the fighting started.

In July 1944, the V Amphibious Corps, now including an additional Marine division, was assigned to the invasion of the Mariana Islands. In this action (Operation Forager), Ralph Smith's division fought alongside the Marines in the hard struggle for the mountainous island of Saipan. During the fight for Mt. Tapotchau in the center of the island, a vast difference in training and tactics between the Marines and the Army led to the 106th Infantry Regiment failing to reduce the area known as "Hell's Pocket," thus falling far behind the advance line of Marines. The corps commander, already ill-disposed toward the 27th Infantry Division because of its perceived lack of aggressiveness on Makin, relieved Ralph Smith of command and ordered him off the island. He contended that Ralph Smith's men had "failed to attack on time," unnecessarily costing Marine lives in the conquest of the island. Five times in the Pacific Theater of Operations were Army generals relieved of command, but it was unprecedented for the order to be given by a Marine Corps general, and the incident caused a considerable rift between the two branches. The Buckner Board, an all-Army panel that investigated the incident, concluded that, while Holland Smith had the authority to fire Ralph Smith, he had not acquainted himself with the particular difficulties faced by the Army troops in the fight for Mt. Tapotchau and that the firing was "not justified by the facts."

Ralph Smith was given command of the 98th Infantry Division charged with the defense of the Hawaiian Islands, but the negative publicity associated with his firing on Saipan made it impractical for him to remain in the Pacific Theater. He was thus transferred to Camp Joseph T. Robinson, Arkansas, where he supervised the Infantry Replacement Training Center. Smith went on to serve as the military attaché at the United States Embassy in Paris and CARE's chief of mission for France. While he worked for CARE he also oversaw operations in other western European countries. Smith was decorated with the Legion of Merit for his service in World War II.

Ralph C. Smith retired from the Army in 1948.

== After retirement ==
General Smith was a fellow at Stanford University's Hoover Institution on War, Revolution and Peace.

He died in 1998 of a lung ailment. He was the last surviving American divisional commander to serve in World War II.

== Personal life ==
His first wife, Madeleine, died in 1975.

In 1980 he remarried to Hildy Jarman who died in 1995.

Military offices
Preceded by Ralph Pennell	Commanding General 27th Infantry Division; 1942–1944	Succeeded by George Wesley Griner Jr.
Preceded by George Wesley Griner Jr.	Commanding General 98th Infantry Division; July–August 1944	Succeeded by Arthur Harper
