= Catalanotti =

Catalanotti (pronounced [katalaˈnɔtti]) is an Italian surname from Sicily, originally indicating Catalan ancestry. Notable people with the surname include:

- Joseph Catalanotti (1887–1946), Italian-American labor leader
- Robert Catalanotti (born 1958), American retired major general

== See also ==
- Catalanotte
- Catalanotto
