= DISCOM =

DISCOM may refer to:

- a divisional support command, a unit in a division of the United States Army
- as an abbreviation for "distribution company," an electricity distribution company>
