= Divisions of the United States Army =

This list of United States Army divisions is divided into three eras: 1911–1917, 1917–1941, and 1941–present. These eras represent the major evolutions of army division structure (there have been several minor changes during these times). The 1911–1917 era lists divisions raised during the Army's first attempts at modernizing the division, prior to the authorization of permanent divisions, and the 1917–1941 era lists the first permanent divisions, prior to advent of specialized (armored, airborne, etc.) divisions. The 1941–present era lists all of the divisions organized, raised, or authorized since then.

As much as possible, divisions are only listed in the eras in which they were first created. Some divisions, such as the 1st Cavalry Division, are listed in multiple eras, as their organizations were drastically changed from one era to the next. Many divisions overlap the years listed in the era categories, mainly due to the slow pace in which they were deactivated, inactivated, or otherwise disbanded.

Several divisions have existed under multiple designations, such as the 10th Mountain Division (10th Light Division (Alpine), 10th Infantry Division). Additionally, several divisions with the same numerical designations were completely separate and unrelated divisions (there have been two 5th Divisions, for instance).

== History ==
Divisions in the United States Army have existed since the American Revolution, but during the 18th and 19th centuries, these were temporary organizations. The concept of the permanent United States Army division was formulated and put to the test following the turn of the 20th century. In 1916, the permanent division would finally be authorized by Congress, resulting in a dramatic change in the Army's force structure. For the first time, the division was the base element of the United States Army and remained as such until the Global War on Terrorism, when the Army switched its emphasis to brigades and brigade combat teams.

Since the authorizations of permanent divisions, the United States Army has raised 128 separate divisions with unique lineages.

=== American Revolution ===
George Washington organized the first divisions of the United States Army on 22 July 1775 in Boston, Massachusetts. Arriving to take command of the Siege of Boston, he split the forces there into three divisions, each composed of two brigades of six to seven regiments. These divisions were led by major generals but with no assigned staff. They were primarily administrative but eventually evolved into semi-permanent tactical organizations.

=== American Civil War ===
During the Civil War, when the first large true field armies in United States history were formed, divisions were the Union Army's basic administrative and organizational unit. They were also the smallest "self-sufficient" units, each composed of two to six brigades. These were typically three brigades for infantry divisions and two brigades for cavalry divisions. A division was typically commanded by a major general, but because Congress refused to promote officers past that grade (with the exception of promoting Ulysses S. Grant to lieutenant general in 1864) major generals were also put in charge of field armies and corps, allowing some divisions to be commanded by brigadier generals. Divisions were numbered sequentially within their corps, but were often referred to by the commander's name in official reports.

When the Army of the Potomac was first formed after the disastrous First Battle of Bull Run, the division was initially the largest unit. It consisted of three infantry brigades, a cavalry regiment, and four artillery batteries. However the cavalry and artillery were eventually spun off to their own units. When army corps were formally created in March 1862, half of the divisional artillery units were used to form an artillery reserve of three brigades for the army. After the Peninsula campaign the cavalry were removed from divisional control to form their own brigades under army control, until February 1863 when they were formed into a dedicated Cavalry Corps of three divisions, each with two brigades and assigned horse artillery. Following Chancellorsville all artillery batteries were removed from divisional control to form brigades under corps control. The evolution of divisions within the Army of the Potomac served as a model by which the other field armies in the Union organized themselves.

In the beginning the division commander was allowed only an assistant adjutant general and three aides-de-camp as their staff. Administrative needs eventually led to the addition of a quartermaster, a commissary of subsistence, an ordnance officer, and a surgeon, all with the rank of major. However, there were no enlisted personnel specifically assigned to support duties, instead requiring either line soldiers be detailed to carry them out or civilian workers employed. The former removed the combat effectiveness of the units they were taken from, while the latter were more difficult to find and replace and tended to be less reliable and obedient.

== Designations ==
Before 1941, only cavalry divisions were specifically designated; infantry divisions were simply designated by "Division". Following the advent of the armored division, infantry divisions became officially designated by "Infantry Division" (with the 25th Infantry Division being the first constituted by the adjutant general as such). All of the 1917–1941 (non-cavalry) divisions, with the exceptions of the 10th through 20th and 101st Divisions, would be redesignated as Infantry Divisions at some point in the 1941–present era.

Other than the aforementioned Armored, Cavalry, and Infantry, the only official Army division designations are Air Assault (one test division), Airborne, Light (three test divisions in World War II), Motorized (briefly authorized from 1942 to 1943), and Mountain. For lineage purposes, the 101st Airborne Division maintains its designation as an airborne division, though it is currently organized as an air assault division.

Divisions listed with an additional identifier in parentheses ("alpine" or "test", for example) existed only with that identifier. Divisions that have held multiple additional identifiers, such as the 1st Cavalry ("airmobile", "heavy") and the 9th Infantry ("light", "motorized"), are left unidentified, regardless of their current additional identifier.

An unspecified division today refers to a United States Army Reserve training division.

- (*) denotes divisions that reorganized under a different division designation while still active
- **Bold denotes current United States Army divisions**

== Divisions of the United States Army (1911–17) ==
- Maneuver Division (1911) – see History of the United States Army

Regular Army 1913–16

- 1st Division (Eastern Department)
- 2nd Division (Central Department)
- 3rd Division (Western Department)
- Cavalry Division: authorized as the Regular Army division for the Southern Department in 1913; never officially numerically designated.
- Punitive Expedition: (provisional division): 1916–17

National Guard 1914–17

- 5th Division
- 6th Division
- 7th Division
- 8th Division
- 9th Division
- 10th Division
- 11th Division
- 12th Division
- 13th Division
- 14th Division
- 15th Division
- 16th Division

=== National Defense Act of 1916 ===
The National Defense Act of 1916 provided that the "Army of the United States" would consist of the Regular Army, the Volunteer Army, the Officers' Reserve Corps, the Enlisted Reserve Corps, the National Guard in the service of the United States, and such other land forces as were or might be authorized by Congress. The president was to determine both the number and type of National Guard units that each state would maintain. Both the Regular Army and the National Guard were to be organized, insofar as practicable, into permanent brigades and divisions.

- 5th Division: 1917* (26th Division)
- 6th Division: 1917* (27th Division)
- 7th Division: 1917* (28th Division)
- 8th Division: 1917* (29th Division)
- 9th Division: 1917* (30th Division)
- 10th Division: 1917* (31st Division)
- 11th Division: 1917* (32nd Division)
- 12th Division: 1917* (33rd Division)
- 13th Division: 1917* (34th Division)
- 14th Division: 1917* (35th Division)
- 15th Division: 1917* (36th Division)
- 16th Division: 1917* (37th Division)
- 17th Division: 1917* (38th Division)
- 18th Division: 1917* (39th Division)
- 19th Division: 1917* (40th Division)
- 20th Division: 1917* (41st Division)

== Divisions of the United States Army (1917 to 1941) ==
=== Cavalry divisions ===
In 1940, the National Guard voluntarily withdrew their allotment of the 21st through 24th Cavalry Divisions, partially in response to the Army's decision that the National Guard did not need four Cavalry Divisions and the Army's unwillingness to allot the National Guard armored divisions. The 61st through 66th Cavalry Divisions were inactivated in 1942.

- 1st Cavalry Division: 1921–present
- 2nd Cavalry Division: Unorganized. A 2nd Cavalry Division was constituted in 1921, but would remain unorganized until World War II.
- 3rd Cavalry Division: Unorganized. The 3rd Cavalry Division was placed on rolls in 1927 to complete an intended Cavalry Corps, but was never organized.
- 15th Cavalry Division: 1917–18
- 21st Cavalry Division: 1921–40
- 22nd Cavalry Division: 1921–40
- 23rd Cavalry Division: 1921–40
- 24th Cavalry Division: 1921–40
- 61st Cavalry Division: 1921–42
- 62nd Cavalry Division: 1921–42
- 63rd Cavalry Division: 1921–42
- 64th Cavalry Division: 1921–42
- 65th Cavalry Division: 1921–42
- 66th Cavalry Division: 1921–42

=== Infantry divisions ===
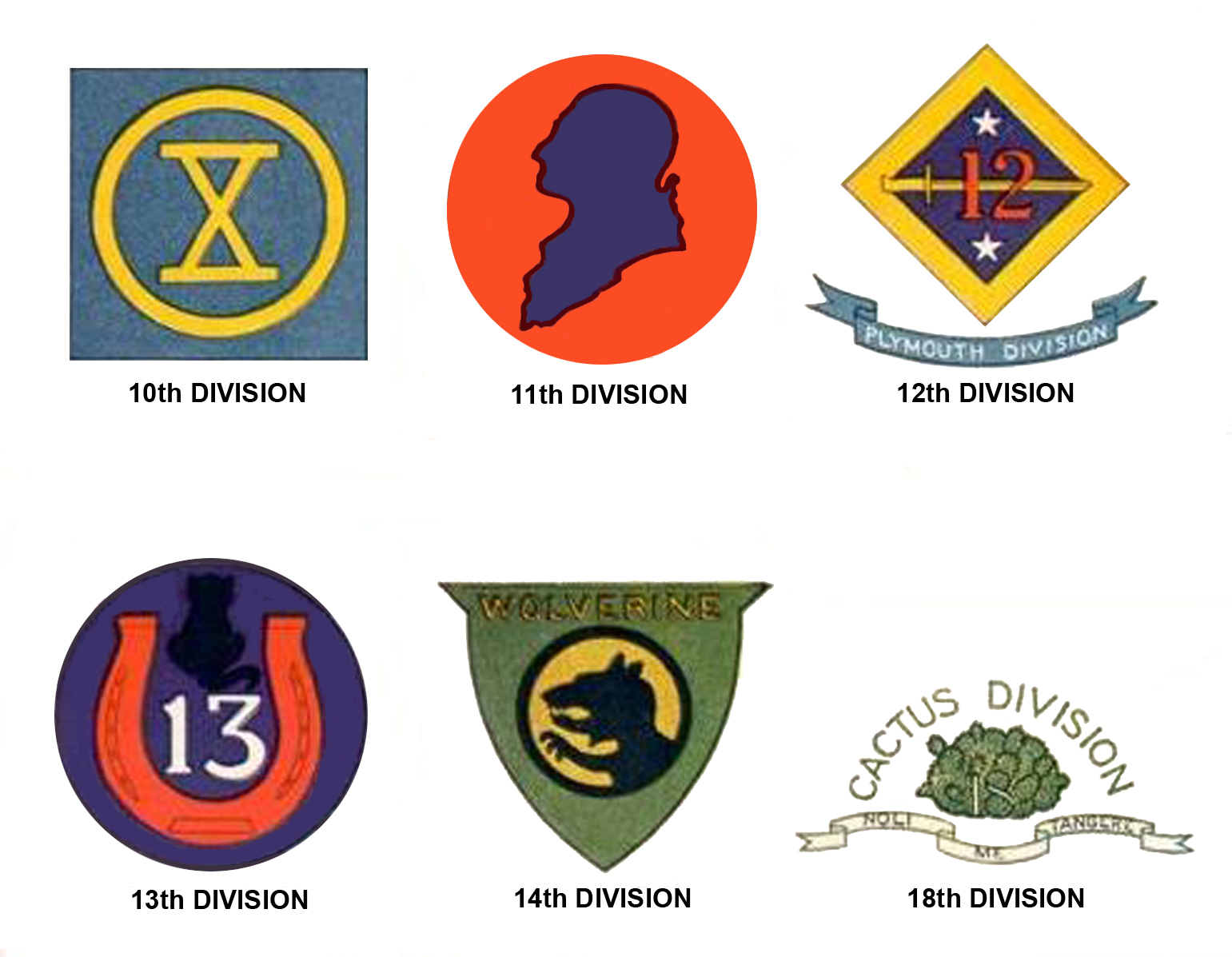
Shoulder Sleeve Insignia of World War I Divisions (the 15th, 16th, 17th, 19th, and 20th Divisions never officially selected insignia)

Various elements of the 4th through 9th Divisions remained on active duty until those divisions' full activation prior to World War II.

The 76th through 91st and 94th through 104th Divisions existed primarily as officer billets with enlisted cadre; they were not completely reactivated until America's entry into World War II.

The infantry brigades, field artillery brigades, and several other of the subordinate units of the Panama Canal, Hawaiian, and Philippine Divisions were numbered accordingly with what should have been the 10th, 11th, and 12th Divisions.

- 1st Division (later 1st Infantry Division): 1917–present
- 2nd Division (later 2nd Infantry Division): 1917–present
- 3rd Division (later 3rd Infantry Division): 1917–present
- 4th Division: 1917–1921; 1940–1946; 1947–present
- 5th Division: 1917–1921; 1939–1946; 1947–1992
- 6th Division: 1917–1921; 1939–1949; 1986–1994
- 7th Division: 1917–1921; 1940–1971; 1974–1994; 1999–2006; 2012–present
- 8th Division: 1918–1919; 1940–1945; 1950–1992
- 9th Division: 1918–1919; 1940–1947; 1947–1962; 1966–1969; 1972–1991
- 10th Division – Organized in 1918 as a Regular Army and National Army division for World War I, the 10th Division did not go overseas and demobilized in February 1919 at Camp Funston, Kansas.
- 11th Division: 1918–1919
- 12th Division: 1918–1919 at Fort Devens, Mass.
- 13th Division: 1918–1919 at Fort Lewis
- 14th Division: 1918–1919 – Organized in 1918 as a Regular Army and National Army division for World War I, the 14th Division did not go overseas and demobilized in February 1919 at Camp Custer, Michigan.
- 15th Division: 1918–1919 – Organized in 1918 as a Regular Army and National Army division for World War I, the 15th Division did not go overseas and demobilized in February 1919 at Camp Logan, Texas
- 16th Division: 1918–1919 – Organized in 1918 as a Regular Army and National Army division for World War I, the 16th Division did not go overseas and demobilized in March 1919 at Camp Kearny, California.
- 17th Division: 1918–1919 - Organized in 1918 as a Regular Army and National Army division for World War I, the 17th Division did not go overseas.
- 18th Division: 1918–1919
- 19th Division: 1918–1919
- 20th Division: 1918–1919
- 26th Division: 1917–1919; 1921–1941* (26th Infantry Division)
- 27th Division: 1917–1919; 1921–1940* (27th Infantry Division)
- 28th Division: 1917–1919; 1921–1941* (28th Infantry Division)
- 29th Division: 1917–1919; 1921–1941* (29th Infantry Division)
- 30th Division: 1917–1919; 1921–1940* (30th Infantry Division)
- 31st Division: 1917–1919; 1923–1940* (31st Infantry Division)
- 32nd Division: 1917–1919; 1921–1940* (32nd Infantry Division)
- 33rd Division: 1917–1919; 1921–1940* (33rd Infantry Division)
- 34th Division: 1917–1919; 1921–1941* (34th Infantry Division)
- 35th Division: 1917–1919; 1921–1940* (35th Infantry Division)
- 36th Division: 1917–1919; 1921–1940* (36th Infantry Division)
- 37th Division: 1917–1919; 1921–1940* (37th Infantry Division)
- 38th Division: 1917–1919; 1921–1941* (38th Infantry Division)
- 39th Division: 1917–1919; 1921–1923
- 40th Division: 1917–1919; 1921–1941* (40th Infantry Division)
- 41st Division: 1917–1919; 1921–1940* (41st Infantry Division)
- 42nd Division: 1917–1919
- 43rd Division: 1921–1941* (43rd Infantry Division)
- 44th Division: 1921–1940* (44th Infantry Division)
- 45th Division: 1921–1940* (45th Infantry Division)
- 76th Division: 1917–1919; 1921–1942* (76th Infantry Division)
- 77th Division: 1917–1919; 1921–1942* (77th Infantry Division)
- 78th Division: 1917–1919; 1921–1942* (78th Infantry Division)
- 79th Division: 1917–1919; 1921–1942* (79th Infantry Division)
- 80th Division: 1917–1919; 1921–1942* (80th Infantry Division)
- 81st Division: 1917–1919; 1921–1942* (81st Infantry Division)
- 82nd Division: 1917–1919; 1921–1942* (82nd Infantry Division)
- 83rd Division: 1917–1919; 1921–1942* (83rd Infantry Division)
- 84th Division: 1917–1919; 1921–1942* (84th Infantry Division)
- 85th Division: 1917–1919; 1921–1942* (85th Infantry Division)
- 86th Division: 1917–1919; 1921–1942* (86th Infantry Division)
- 87th Division: 1917–1919; 1921–1942* (87th Infantry Division)
- 88th Division: 1917–1919; 1921–1942* (88th Infantry Division)
- 89th Division: 1917–1919; 1921–1942* (89th Infantry Division)
- 90th Division: 1917–1919; 1921–1942* (90th Infantry Division)
- 91st Division: 1917–1919; 1921–1942* (91st Infantry Division)
- 92nd Division (Colored): 1917–1919
- 93rd Division (Colored): 1917–1918—provisional division
- 94th Division: 1921–1942* (94th Infantry Division) A 94th Division was intended as a Spanish-speaking division recruited in Puerto Rico for World War I, but the assignment was withheld due to political wrangling.
- 95th Division: 1918–1919; 1921–1942* (95th Infantry Division)
- 96th Division: 1918–1919; 1921–1942* (96th Infantry Division)
- 97th Division: 1918; 1921–1943* (97th Infantry Division)
- 98th Division: 1918; 1921–1942* (98th Infantry Division)
- 99th Division: 1918; 1921–1942* (99th Infantry Division)
- 100th Division: 1918; 1921–1942* (100th Infantry Division)
- 101st Division: 1918; 1921–1942* (101st Airborne Division)
- 102nd Division: 1918; 1921–1942* (102nd Infantry Division)
- 103rd Division: 1921–1942* (103rd Infantry Division)
- 104th Division: 1921–1942* (104th Infantry Division)
- Hawaiian Division: 1921–1941* (24th Infantry Division; see also 25th Infantry Division)
- Panama Canal Division: 1921–1932
- Philippine Division: 1921–1942 (see 12th Infantry Division)

== Divisions of the United States Army (1941 to present) ==
Divisions in bold are currently active.*

=== Air assault divisions ===
- 11th Air Assault Division (Test) (formerly 11th Airborne Division): 1963–1965

=== Airborne divisions ===
- 11th Airborne Division: 1943–1958; 2022–present
- 13th Airborne Division: 1943–1946
- 15th Airborne Division: placed on rolls but not organized during World War II
- 17th Airborne Division: 1943–1945; 1948–1949
- 80th Airborne Division: 1946–1952* (80th Infantry Division)
- 82nd Airborne Division: 1942–present
- 84th Airborne Division: 1946–1952* (84th Infantry Division)
- 100th Airborne Division: 1946–1952* (100th Infantry Division)
- 101st Airborne Division: 1942–1945; 1948–1949; 1950–1953; 1954–present
- 108th Airborne Division: 1946–1952* (108th Infantry Division)

In addition, the 6th, 9th, 18th, 21st and 135th Airborne Divisions were "created" as part of military deception operations during World War II.

=== Armored divisions ===
- 1st Armored Division: 1940–1946; 1951–1957; 1962–present. The 1st Armored Division's Combat Command A remained on active duty between 1957 and 1962.
- 2nd Armored Division: 1940–1995
- 3rd Armored Division: 1941–1945; 1947–1992
- 4th Armored Division: 1941–1946; 1954–1971. The 4th Armored Division was effectively organized as the United States Constabulary from 1946 to 1954.
- 5th Armored Division: 1941–1945; 1950–1956
- 6th Armored Division: 1942–1945; 1950–1956
- 7th Armored Division: 1942–1945; 1950–1953
- 8th Armored Division: 1942–1945
- 9th Armored Division: 1942–1945
- 10th Armored Division: 1942–1945
- 11th Armored Division: 1942–1945
- 12th Armored Division: 1942–1945
- 13th Armored Division: 1942–1945; 1947–1952
- 14th Armored Division: 1942–1945
- 15th Armored Division: created only as a military deception, a "phantom" unit. See United States Army deception formations of World War II.
- 16th Armored Division: 1943–1945
- 18th Armored Division: never actually organized during World War II
- 19th Armored Division: unorganized World War II division
- 20th Armored Division: 1943–1946
- 21st Armored Division: 1946-1952 USAR Detroit, Michigan
- 22nd Armored Division: unorganized World War II division
- 25th Armored Division: created only as a military deception, a "phantom," as part of Operation Fortitude. See United States Army deception formations of World War II.
- 27th Armored Division: 1954–1967
- 30th Armored Division: 1954–1973. The 30th Armored Division was organized as the result of an agreement between Tennessee and North Carolina to split the 30th Infantry Division.
- 39th Armored Division: phantom World War II division
- 40th Armored Division: 1954–1967
- 48th Armored Division: 1954–1968
- 49th Armored Division: 1946–1967; 1973–2004
- 50th Armored Division: 1946–1993

=== Cavalry divisions ===
- 1st Cavalry Division: 1921–present
- 2nd Cavalry Division: 1941–1942; 1943–1944

=== Infantry divisions ===
- 1st Infantry Division: 1917–present
- 2nd Infantry Division: 1917–present
- 3rd Infantry Division: 1917–present
- 4th Infantry Division: 1940–1942* (4th Motorized Division); 1943–1946; 1947–present
- 5th Infantry Division: 1939–1950; 1951–1953; 1954–1957; 1962–1992
- 6th Infantry Division: 1939–1942* (6th Motorized Division); 1943–1949; 1950–1956; 1967–1968; 1984–1998. The 6th Infantry Division itself was deactivated in 1994, but the 1st Brigade, 6th Infantry Division remained in the active force under that designation until being reflagged as the 172nd Infantry Brigade in 1998.
- 7th Infantry Division: 1940–1942* (7th Motorized Division); 1943–1971; 1974–1994; 1999–2006; 2012–Present
- 8th Infantry Division: 1940–1942* (8th Motorized Division); 1943–1945; 1950–1992
- 9th Infantry Division: 1940–1962; 1966–1969; 1972–1991. The Division experienced a brief period of inactivation in 1947.
- **10th Infantry Division** (10th Mountain Division): 1943–1945; 1948–1958; 1985-present
- 11th Infantry Division: phantom World War II division
- 12th Infantry Division: (formerly Philippine Division): 1921–1942; 1946–1947
- 14th Infantry Division: phantom World War II division
- 15th Infantry Division: phantom World War II division
- 16th Infantry Division: phantom World War II division
- 17th Infantry Division: phantom World War II division
- 19th Infantry Division: phantom World War II division
- 21st Infantry Division: phantom World War II division
- 22nd Infantry Division: phantom World War II division
- 23rd Infantry Division (Americal Division 1942–1945): 1954–1956; 1967–1971
- 24th Infantry Division (formerly Hawaiian Division): 1941–1970; 1975–1996; 1999–2006
- 25th Infantry Division: 1941–present
- 26th Infantry Division: 1941–1945; 1946–1993
- 27th Infantry Division: 1940–1945; 1946–1954* (27th Armored Division)
- 28th Infantry Division: 1941–1945; 1946–present
- 29th Infantry Division: 1941–1946; 1946–1967; 1985–present
- 30th Infantry Division: 1940–1945; 1946–1973
- 31st Infantry Division: 1940–1945; 1946–1968
- 32nd Infantry Division: 1940–1946; 1946–1968
- 33rd Infantry Division: 1940–1946; 1946–1968
- 34th Infantry Division: 1941–1945; 1946–1963; 1991–present
- 35th Infantry Division: 1940–1945; 1946–1963; 1984–present
- 36th Infantry Division: 1940–1945; 1946–1968; 2004–present
- 37th Infantry Division: 1940–1945; 1946–1968
- 38th Infantry Division: 1941–1945; 1946–present
- 39th Infantry Division: 1946–1968
- 40th Infantry Division: 1941–1946; 1946–1954* (40th Armored Division); 1973–present
- 41st Infantry Division: 1940–1945; 1946–1968
- 42nd Infantry Division: 1943–1945; 1947–present
- 43rd Infantry Division: 1941–1945; 1946–1963
- 44th Infantry Division: 1940–1945; 1946–1954
- 45th Infantry Division: 1940–1945; 1946–1968
- 46th Infantry Division: 1946–1968
- 47th Infantry Division: 1946–1991
- 48th Infantry Division: 1946–1954* (48th Armored Division)
- 49th Infantry Division: 1947–1967 (former 52nd Infantry Division)
- 50th Infantry Division: phantom World War II division
- 51st Infantry Division: 1946–1963
- 52nd Infantry Division: 1946–1947 (renamed 49th Infantry Division)
- 55th Infantry Division: phantom World War II division
- 59th Infantry Division: phantom World War II division
- 61st Infantry Division: never actually organized during World War II
- 62nd Infantry Division: never actually organized during World War II
- 63rd Infantry Division: 1943–1945; 1952–1965
- 65th Infantry Division: 1943–1945
- 66th Infantry Division: 1943–1945
- 67th Infantry Division: never actually organized during World War II
- 68th Infantry Division: never actually organized during World War II
- 69th Infantry Division: 1943–1945; 1954–1956
- 70th Infantry Division: 1943–1945; 1952–1955* (70th Division)
- 71st Infantry Division: 1944–1946; 1954–1956
- 72nd Infantry Division: never actually organized during World War II
- 73rd Infantry Division: unorganized World War II division
- 74th Infantry Division: unorganized World War II division
- 75th Infantry Division: 1943–1945; 1952–1957
- 76th Infantry Division: 1942–1945; 1946–1955* (76th Division)
- 77th Infantry Division: 1942–1946; 1946–1965
- 78th Infantry Division: 1942–1946; 1946–1955* (78th Division)
- 79th Infantry Division: 1942–1945; 1946–1963
- 80th Infantry Division: 1942–1946* (80th Airborne Division); 1952–1955* (80th Division)
- 81st Infantry Division: 1942–1946; 1946–1965
- 82nd Infantry Division: 1942* (82nd Airborne Division)
- 83rd Infantry Division: 1942–1946; 1946–1965
- 84th Infantry Division: 1942–1946* (84th Airborne Division); 1952–1955* (84th Division)
- 85th Infantry Division: 1942–1955* (85th Division)
- 86th Infantry Division: 1942–1946
- 87th Infantry Division: 1942–1945; 1946–1957
- 88th Infantry Division: 1942–1947
- 89th Infantry Division: 1942–1943* (89th Light Division); 1944–1945; 1946–1955* (89th Division)
- 90th Infantry Division: 1942–1945; 1946–1965
- 91st Infantry Division: 1942–1945; 1946–1955* (91st Division)
- 92nd Infantry Division (Colored): 1942–1945
- 93rd Infantry Division (Colored): 1942–1946. Although the 93rd Infantry Division shares the same number designation and patch as the previous 93rd Division, the two divisions are otherwise unrelated and do not share lineal ties.
- 94th Infantry Division: 1942–1946; 1946–1963
- 95th Infantry Division: 1942–1945; 1946–1955* (95th Division)
- 96th Infantry Division: 1942–1946; 1946–1963
- 97th Infantry Division: 1943–1946
- 98th Infantry Division: 1942–1946; 1946–1955* (98th Division)
- 99th Infantry Division: 1942–1945
- 100th Infantry Division: 1942–1946* (100th Airborne Division); 1952–1955* (100th Division)
- 102nd Infantry Division: 1942–1946; 1946–1965
- 103rd Infantry Division: 1942–1945; 1946–1963
- 104th Infantry Division: 1942–1945; 1946–1959* (104th Division)
- 105th Infantry Division: never actually organized during World War II
- 106th Infantry Division: 1943–1945; 1946–1950. The 106th Infantry Division was never officially added to the troop list following World War II, despite having been almost completely organized in Puerto Rico by 1948; subsequently, the War Department determined the division was not needed and deactivated the division headquarters in 1950.
- 107th Infantry Division: never actually organized during World War II
- 108th Infantry Division: A military deception during World War II. See United States Army deception formations of World War II. Active 1952–1955* (108th Division)
- 109th Infantry Division: "Phantom" World War II division. See United States Army deception formations of World War II.
- 112th Infantry Division: phantom World War II division
- 119th Infantry Division: phantom World War II division
- 125th Infantry Division: phantom World War II division
- 130th Infantry Division: phantom World War II division
- 141st Infantry Division: phantom World War II division
- 157th Infantry Division: phantom World War II division

The 105th and 107th Infantry Divisions were intended to be negro divisions of the Army of the United States; however, due to a shortage of available manpower, their activations were canceled in 1942.

=== Light divisions ===
- 10th Light Division (Alpine): 1943–1944* (10th Mountain Division)
- 71st Light Division (Pack): 1943–1944* (71st Infantry Division)
- 89th Light Division (Truck): 1943–1944* (89th Infantry Division)

=== Motorized divisions ===
- 4th Motorized Division: 1942–1943* (4th Infantry Division)
- 5th Motorized Division: phantom World War II division
- 6th Motorized Division: 1942–1943* (6th Infantry Division)
- 7th Motorized Division: 1942–1943* (7th Infantry Division)
- 8th Motorized Division: 1942–1943* (8th Infantry Division)
- 90th Motorized Division: 1942–1943* (90th Infantry Division)

=== Mountain divisions ===
- 10th Mountain Division: 1944–1945; 1985–present

=== Reserve training divisions ===
In an attempt to maintain its divisions, the Army Reserve transformed several of its combat divisions into training divisions; these divisions were still designated as infantry divisions until authorized as "divisions (training)" by the adjutant general in 1959.

- 69th Division: 1954–1956
- 70th Division: 1955–1996
- 75th Division: 1993–2008
- 76th Division: 1955–1996
- 78th Division: 1955–2008
- 80th Division: 1955–2008
- 84th Division: 1955–2004
- 85th Division: 1955–2008
- 87th Division: 1993–2008
- 89th Division: 1955–1975
- 91st Division: 1955–2008, 2010–present
- 95th Division: 1955–present
- 98th Division: 1955–2008
- 100th Division: 1955–present
- 104th Division: 1959–2008
- 108th Division: 1955–2008
- First Army Division East: 2006–present
- First Army Division West: 2006–present

== Divisions planned but never actually formed during World War II ==
At the time of the Japanese attacks on Pearl Harbor, Wake Island, and the Philippines, the United States Army was composed of 37 divisions, including the Philippine Division. Initially, necessary mobilization was estimated to be as high as 350 divisions, but the Army ultimately settled on a 100-division plan.

This relatively low number (compared to the high estimates) was partially due to the army's policy of assigning many combat units, particularly artillery and tank destroyer units, directly to corps and higher-level commands. These non-divisional units numbered approximately 1.5 million soldiers, enough personnel to man roughly 100 more divisions. The strategic philosophy was that such units could be assigned to divisions on an as-needed basis, and would allow divisions to remain as mobile and flexible as possible. By the end of 1943, U.S. Army strength stood at more than 70 divisions.

Allied gains in 1942 and 1943 resulted in a further contraction of U.S. mobilization, and the last wartime division, the 65th Infantry Division, was activated on 16 August 1943. In all, 91 divisions served in the U.S. Army in World War II. When the decision was made to halt the increase in divisions, 12 more divisions were still on the rolls, but would not be organized, though several of these would be organized following the war. They were the 15th Airborne Division, the 18th, 21st and 22nd Armored Divisions, the 19th Armored Division, which was in fact activated following the war, the 61st, 62nd, 67th, 68th, 72nd, 73rd, and 74th Infantry Divisions, and the 105th and 107th Infantry Divisions, which were intended to be formations composed of black soldiers.

Unique among the 14 unorganized divisions, the 15th Airborne Division was not only a victim of the decision to set the size of the Army at 89 divisions (the 2nd Cavalry Division had been deactivated during the war and the Philippine Division was destroyed as a result of the Japanese victory in the Philippines), but also because it had become evident that the Army Air Forces lacked enough transport aircraft to support a sixth airborne division. The 13th Airborne Division never saw combat for this very reason.

The 105th and 107th Infantry Divisions were to join the 92nd and 93rd Infantry Divisions as Negro divisions. A shortage of manpower resulted in the activation of the 105th and 107th being canceled in 1942.

== See also ==
- Formations of the United States Army
- Division insignia of the United States Army
- United States Army deception formations of World War II
