= 304th Infantry Regiment =

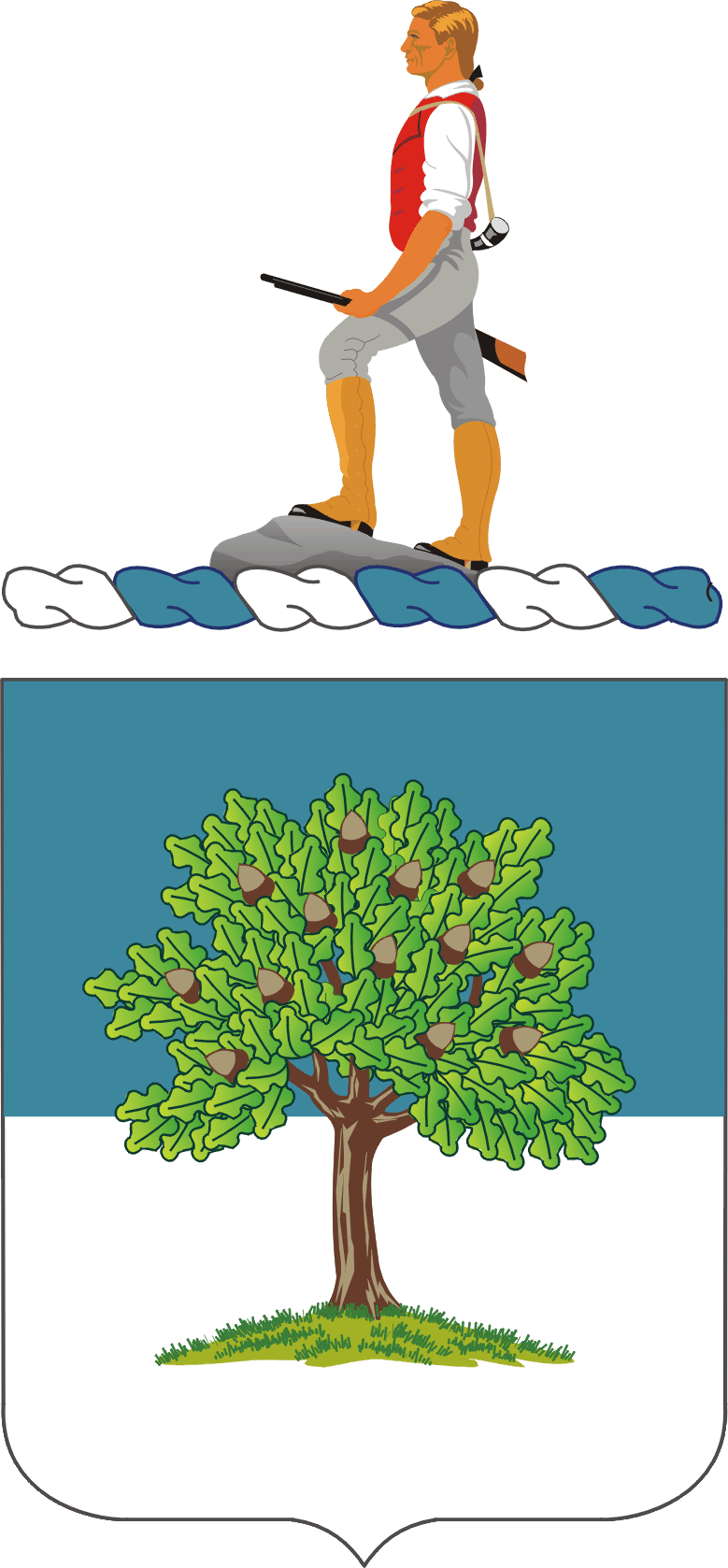
- Coat of arms
- Active: 1917 – 19; 1921 – 45; 1946–present
- Country: United States
- Branch: U.S. Army
- Type: Training unit
- Part of: 98th Division
- Motto: "Forward"
- Engagements: World War I World War II; Operation Iraqi Freedom
- Battle honours: Battle of the Ardennes; Battle of the Rhineland; Battle of Central Germany

Insignia
- Identification symbol

The 304th Infantry Regiment currently consists of two battalions in the United States Army Reserve. In the current organizational plan of the U.S. Army, regimental designation is used only in historical tradition; there is no regimental commander, staff or headquarters. The 1st Battalion, 304th Regiment is headquartered in Londonderry, New Hampshire, and the 3rd Battalion, 304th Regiment is headquartered in Saco, Maine.

== World War I ==
The 304th Regiment was created primarily with men from Connecticut as part of the 76th Infantry Division on 29 August 1917, at Camp Devens, Massachusetts, for the purpose of fighting Imperial Germany in World War I. Colonel Joseph S. Herron was appointed as the unit's first commander and set sail with the unit from Boston Harbor on 7 July 1918. The unit arrived in England, rested, then crossed the Channel for Le Havre, France, on 27 July 1918. Once in place in France, the unit served as a replacement regiment, providing officers and soldiers to the units currently fighting on the front line.

The war ended on November 11, 1918, and the unit left France in 1919, being deactivated on 20 January 1919.

== Interwar period ==
The 304th Infantry was reconstituted in the Organized Reserve on 24 June 1921, assigned to the 76th Division, and allotted to the First Corps Area. It was initiated on 23 December 1921 with regimental headquarters at Hartford, Connecticut. Subordinate battalion headquarters concurrently organized as follows: 1st Battalion at Manchester, Connecticut; 2nd Battalion at Hartford; and 3rd Battalion at Torrington, Connecticut. Typically conducted inactive training period meetings at the State Arsenal and Armory in Hartford. The regiment conducted summer training most years with the 9th Division's 5th and 13th Infantry Regiments at Camp Devens, Massachusetts, or Fort Adams, Rhode Island. The regiment also conducted infantry Citizens Military Training Camps some years at Camp Devens as an alternate form of summer training. The primary ROTC "feeder" school for new Reserve lieutenants for the regiment was Connecticut Agricultural College in Storrs, Connecticut. The designated mobilization training station for the regiment was Camp Devens.

== World War II ==
With America's declaration of war on Nazi Germany in 1941, units in the Reserve Forces were called to active duty. The 304th Regiment, with the rest of the 76th Division, was called to active duty on 15 June 1942, and sent to Fort Meade, Maryland, to prepare for deployment overseas. The regiment completed training on 28 September 1942, and would remain on casual status until 25 February 1943.

The regiment returned to combat status on 25 February 1943, and moved to A.P. Hill Military Reservation at Fredericksburg, Virginia. Colonel Wallace A. Choquette took command on 28 September 1943, and the unit set forth for Camp McCoy, Wisconsin. For the next year the unit continued to train, and finally on 11 November 1944, the regiment moved out for Europe.

Once in Europe, the 304th Regiment participated in the Battle of the Bulge, the Battle of the Rhineland and the Battle of Central Germany. When hostilities ended on VE Day, the 304th Regiment was given the task of governing Altenburg and Rochlitz. The regiment was disbanded while still in Germany on 31 August 1945.

== Postwar ==
Just as after World War II, the 304th Regiment was reconstituted in the Army Reserves on 7 October 1946. But the headquarters was moved to Portland, Maine, rather than Hartford, Connecticut. The headquarters was moved to Portsmouth, New Hampshire, in 1952. By 1963, the regiment's executive officer was Lt. Col. Clarence E. "Chief" Boston, who was head football coach of the New Hampshire Wildcats in nearby Durham, New Hampshire. The US Army moved away from the use of regiments as a command structure, and the 304th Regiment ceased to exist as a command on 31 January 1968. However, the three subordinate battalions continued to exist as elements of the 76th Division.

== Present day ==
The 2nd Battalion would eventually also be deactivated, but the 1st and 3rd battalions continue to survive, albeit in different divisions, with presences from Maine to Maryland. The 1st Battalion of the 304th Regiment, known as the Patriot Battalion, is headquartered in Londonderry, New Hampshire, as part of the 98th Division with the mission of executing basic training for the US Army at Fort Leonard Wood, formerly Fort Benning, Georgia, while the 3rd Battalion of the 304th Regiment (Forward Battalion) is headquartered in Saco, Maine, as a part of the 104th Training Division with the mission of supporting military training for the United States Corps of Cadets, United States Military Academy at West Point, New York.

== Lineage ==
- Constituted 5 August 1917 in the National Army as the 304th Infantry and assigned to the 76th Division.
- Organized 29 August 1917 at Camp Devens, Massachusetts.
- Demobilized 20 January 1919 at Camp Devens, Massachusetts.
- Reconstituted 24 June 1921 in the Organized Reserves as the 304th Infantry Regiment and assigned to the 76th Division.
- Organized in December 1921 with headquarters in Hartford, Connecticut.
- Ordered to active duty 15 June 1942 at Fort Meade, Maryland.
- Disbanded 31 August 1945 in Germany.
- Reconstituted 7 October 1946 in the Organized Reserves as the 304th Infantry Regiment and assigned to the 76th Division.
- Activated 17 December 1946 with headquarters in Portland, Maine.
- Headquarters moved to Portsmouth, New Hampshire, on 9 July 1952.
- Reorganized 31 January 1968 to consist of the 1st, 2nd and 3rd Battalions as elements of the 76th Division (Training).
- Reorganized 16 October 1996 as the 1st, 2nd and 3rd Battalions as elements of the 98th Division (Institutional Training)
- Reorganized 1 October 2007 as 1st Battalion, 108th Training Command (Initial Entry Training) and 3rd Battalion, 84th Training Command (Unit Readiness). The 2nd Battalion was inactivated effective this date.

== Insignia ==
=== Distinctive unit insignia ===
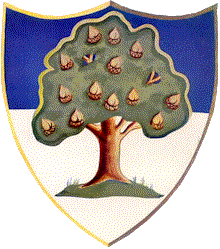
The original version of the 304th Regiment's insignia

- Description: A gold metal and enamel device 1 1/4 inches (3.2 cm) in height overall consisting of a shield blazoned: Per fess Azure and Argent, on a low mount an oak tree fructed of thirteen acorns Proper. Attached below the shield a blue scroll inscribed "FORWARD" in gold letters.
- Symbolism: The shield is blue and white, the Infantry colors, and displays the Charter Oak, representative of Connecticut.
- Background: The distinctive unit insignia was originally approved for the 304th Infantry Regiment, Organized Reserves on 14 November 1924. It was redesignated for the 304th Regiment, Army Reserve, on 6 May 1960.

=== Coat of arms ===
- Blazon:
  - Shield: Per fess Azure and Argent, on a low mount an oak tree fructed of thirteen acorns Proper.
  - Crest: That for the regiments and separate battalions of the Army Reserve: From a wreath Argent and Azure, the Lexington Minute Man Proper. The statue of the Minute Man, Captain John Parker (H.H. Kitson, sculptor), stands on the Common in Lexington, Massachusetts.
  - Motto: "Forward".
- Symbolism:
  - Shield: The shield is blue and white, the Infantry colors, and displays the Charter Oak, representative of Connecticut. Thirteen acorns represent the original colonies.
  - Crest: The crest is that of the U.S. Army Reserve.
- Background: The coat of arms was originally approved for the 304th Infantry Regiment, Organized Reserves on 22 August 1924. It was redesignated for the 304th Regiment, Army Reserve, on 6 May 1960.
