= 518th =

518th may refer to:

- 518th Air Defense Group, disbanded United States Air Force organization
- 518th Fighter-Interceptor Squadron, inactive United States Air Force unit
- 518th Infantry Regiment (United States), Infantry regiment in the Army Reserve

== See also ==
- 518 (number)
- 518, the year 518 (DXVIII) of the Julian calendar
- 518 BC
