= Jack C. Stultz =

United States Army general (born 1952)

Jack Calvin Stultz, Jr.
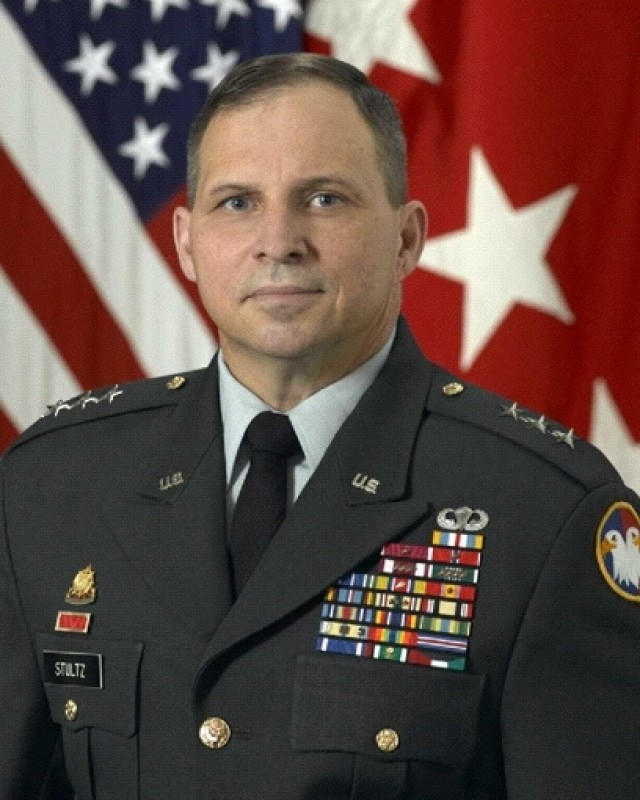
- Lieutenant General Jack C. Stultz, Jr. Commander, United States Army Reserve
- Born: June 11, 1952 (age 74); Dillon, South Carolina, U.S.
- Military career
- Allegiance: United States of America
- Branch: United States Army
- Service years: 1974–2012
- Rank: Lieutenant General
- Unit: United States Army Reserve Command
- Commands: United States Army Reserve Command; 143d Transportation Command; 32d Transportation Group; 257th Transportation Battalion
- Conflicts: Operation Desert Storm; Operation Iraqi Freedom
- Awards: Defense Superior Service Medal; Legion of Merit (2); Bronze Star Medal; Meritorious Service Medal (4); Army Commendation Medal (5); Army Achievement Medal
- Other work: Operations Manager, Procter and Gamble

Lieutenant General Jack C. Stultz, Jr. (born June 11, 1952) is a retired United States Army general who served as the commanding general of the United States Army Reserve.

== Biography ==
Jack Calvin Stultz, Jr. was born in Leaksville North Carolina. He attended Davidson College in Davidson, North Carolina, graduating with a Bachelor of Arts degree in history. He played and lettered in football from 1971 to 1973. Stultz entered active duty in 1974 after receiving his commission as an engineer officer from the Reserve Officers' Training Corps. After completing the Engineer Officer Basic Course and Airborne School, he was assigned to the 20th Engineer Battalion, Fort Campbell, Kentucky, and served as platoon leader, executive officer, and commander, Company B, 20th Engineer Battalion.

Stultz left active duty in June 1979 to pursue a civilian career. He also began his Army Reserve career with assignment to the 108th Division (Infantry OSUT), headquartered in Charlotte, North Carolina. Stultz served in a variety of positions with the 108th Division, including brigade assistant operations officer, battalion personnel officer, commander, Company D, 4th Battalion 108th Regiment, and division assistant operations officer.

Stultz began his career with the Transportation Corps in February 1987 with an assignment to the 32d Transportation Group (Composite), which was mobilized and deployed in November 1990 in support of Operation Desert Shield/Desert Storm. Stultz was responsible for providing transportation support to XVIII Airborne Corps and VII Corps in Saudi Arabia, Iraq, and Kuwait. Stultz assumed responsibilities as the group executive officer after returning from the desert in July 1991.

He took command of the 257th Transportation Battalion (Movement Control) in 1995. The battalion deployed to the Balkans in March 1997 in support of Operation Joint Endeavor/Joint Guard, providing movement control support for operations in Hungary, Croatia, and Bosnia.

He took command of the 32d Transportation Group in 1998, and served in this capacity until assuming duties as deputy commanding general, 143d Transportation Command in 1999.

Stultz deployed to Kuwait in October 2002 as commander, 143d Transportation Command (Forward), establishing initial logistics operations in support of Operation Iraqi Freedom. Moving forward into Iraq with the initial ground offensive, he established the first forward logistics hub at Tallil and initial rail operations at Garma, located west of Baghdad. In October 2003, he was assigned as director of movements, distribution, and transportation, Coalition Forces Land Component Command-Kuwait, responsible for the deployment and redeployment of sustainment supplies for United States and Coalition forces in Kuwait and Iraq. From January to August 2004, he was responsible for port and ground transportation operations for the largest movement of forces since World War II, more commonly known as a "surge." Stultz returned to the United States in August 2004 after 22 months in theater.

In October 2004, Stultz was promoted to the rank of major general and assumed command of the 143d Transportation Command in Orlando, Florida, which provided command and control to twelve units in the southeastern United States.

=== United States Army Reserve Command ===
Stultz was assigned as deputy commanding general of the United States Army Reserve Command in October 2005. On May 25, 2006, he was promoted to the rank of lieutenant general and became chief, Army Reserve, and commanding general, United States Army Reserve Command. On June 9, 2012, Stultz relinquished command to Lieutenant General Jeffrey Talley. Nearly 500 guests were on hand to honor Lt. Gen. Jack C. Stultz and his wife, Laura, on June 8, 2012, at the Raleigh Convention Center. Stultz retired from active duty on 15 September 2012 with over 38 years of service. He and his wife, Lauralyn Brown Stultz, reside in Apopka, Florida. In his retirement, Stultz serves on the board of directors of VSE Corporation in Alexandria, Virginia and as a private consultant to several major corporations and non-profit organizations.

== Awards and decorations ==
Parachutist Badge
Army Staff Identification Badge

Defense Superior Service Medal
Legion of Merit with oak leaf cluster
Bronze Star Medal with oak leaf cluster
Meritorious Service Medal with three oak leaf clusters
Army Commendation Medal with four oak leaf clusters
Army Achievement Medal
Army Reserve Components Achievement Medal with four oak leaf clusters
National Defense Service Medal with service star
Armed Forces Expeditionary Medal
Southwest Asia Service Medal
Iraq Campaign Medal
Global War on Terrorism Expeditionary Medal
Global War on Terrorism Service Medal
Armed Forces Service Medal
Armed Forces Reserve Medal with bronze Hourglass and "M" Device
Army Service Ribbon
Army Reserve Components Overseas Training Ribbon
NATO Medal
Kuwait Liberation Medal (Saudi Arabia)
Kuwait Liberation Medal (Kuwait)
Meritorious Unit Commendation

Military offices
Preceded by James R. Helmly	Commanding General; United States Army Reserve; May 25, 2006 - June 9, 2012	Succeeded by Jeffrey W. Talley
