= Catalanotto =

Catalanotto (pronounced [katalaˈnɔtto]) is an Italian surname from Sicily, originally indicating Catalan ancestry. Notable people with the surname include:

- Frank Catalanotto (born 1974), American baseball player and coach
- Peter Catalanotto (born 1959), American book illustrator

== See also ==
- Catalanotte
- Catalanotti
