= Robert Catalanotti =

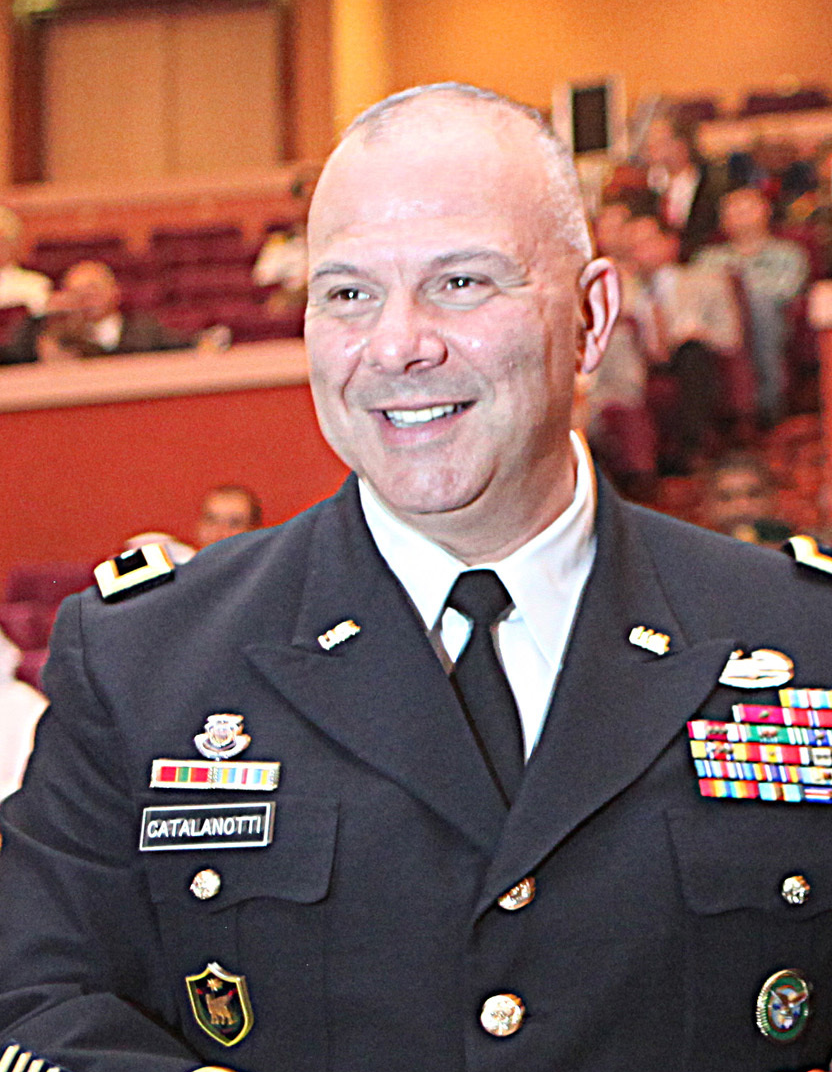
- Major General Catalanotti, Director, Exercises and Training Directorate, USCENTCOM
- Military career
- Allegiance: United States
- Branch: United States Army Reserve
- Service years: 1980 – 2014
- Rank: Major General
- Commands: 98th Division; Camp Taji
- Awards: Distinguished Service Medal; Defense Superior Service Medal; Legion of Merit; Bronze Star; Meritorious Service Medal (3)

Robert Catalanotti (born September 7, 1958) is a retired major general, currently a Senior Fellow at the Joint Forces Staff College (JFSC) in Norfolk, VA. He last served as Senior Advisor [Senior Executive Service (SES)] in the Office of the Secretary of Defense International Affairs (Policy), Pentagon, prior to that, as Director, Exercises and Training Directorate J-7, United States Central Command (USCENTCOM). Earlier, he was assigned as Commander/Program Manager of Critical Infrastructure, US Security Cooperation in the Kingdom of Saudi Arabia (USCENTCOM). From 2007 to 2008, Catalanotti was the Commanding General, 98th Division, now relocated at Fort Benning, Georgia. From 2004 to 2005, he was assigned base commander at Camp Taji, Iraq.

Catalanotti was inducted into the National Army ROTC Hall of Fame and is a recipient of the Department of State Superior Honor Award and the Engineer Regiment Bronze Order of the de Fleury Medal.

== Education ==
Catalanotti is a 1980 graduate of Assumption University who gained his commission as a second lieutenant through cross-town enrollment in Army ROTC at Worcester Polytechnic Institute. He holds a master's degree from Suffolk University and a master's in strategic studies from the United States Army War College.

== Awards and decorations ==

Combat Action Badge
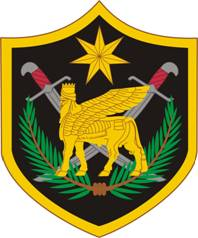
MNF-I Combat Service Identification Badge

United States Central Command Identification Badge

Distinguished Service Medal
Defense Superior Service Medal

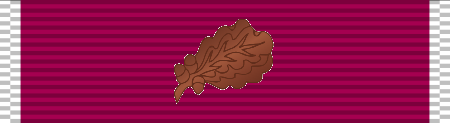

Legion of Merit (with 1 Oak Leaf Cluster)
Bronze Star
Meritorious Service Medal (with 3 Oak Leaf Clusters)
Army Commendation Medal (with 2 Oak Leaf Clusters)
Army Achievement Medal (with 1 Oak Leaf Cluster)
State Department Superior Honor Award
Joint Meritorious Unit Award (with 3 Oak Leaf Clusters)
Army Superior Unit Award
Army Reserve Components Achievement Medal (with 7 oak leaf clusters)
National Defense Service Medal (with 1 Service Stars)
Iraq Campaign Medal (with 2 Service Stars)
Global War on Terrorism Expeditionary Medal
Global War on Terrorism Service Medal
Armed Forces Reserve Medal with silver hourglass, M device, and award numeral
Army Service Ribbon
Army Overseas Service Ribbon (with award numeral)
Army Reserve Components Overseas Training Ribbon (with award numeral)
