= George Wesley Griner Jr. =

United States Army general

General George Wesley Griner Jr. (1895–1975) was an American soldier who served as Assistant Chief of Staff for Supply (G-4) in the early days of the European Theater of Operations to January 1943, then as Assistant Commanding General of the 77th Infantry Division to August 1943, and as Major General commanded the 13th Airborne Division (United States) at formation at Ft. Bragg, and then the 98th Infantry Division from November 1943 to 26 June 1944 and then the 27th Infantry Division in the Battle of Saipan (from 10:30 on 28 June 1944).

Griner retired in 1946, and died in 1975.

He is buried at the Mobile National Cemetery.
