= 317th Infantry Regiment =

Army military unit

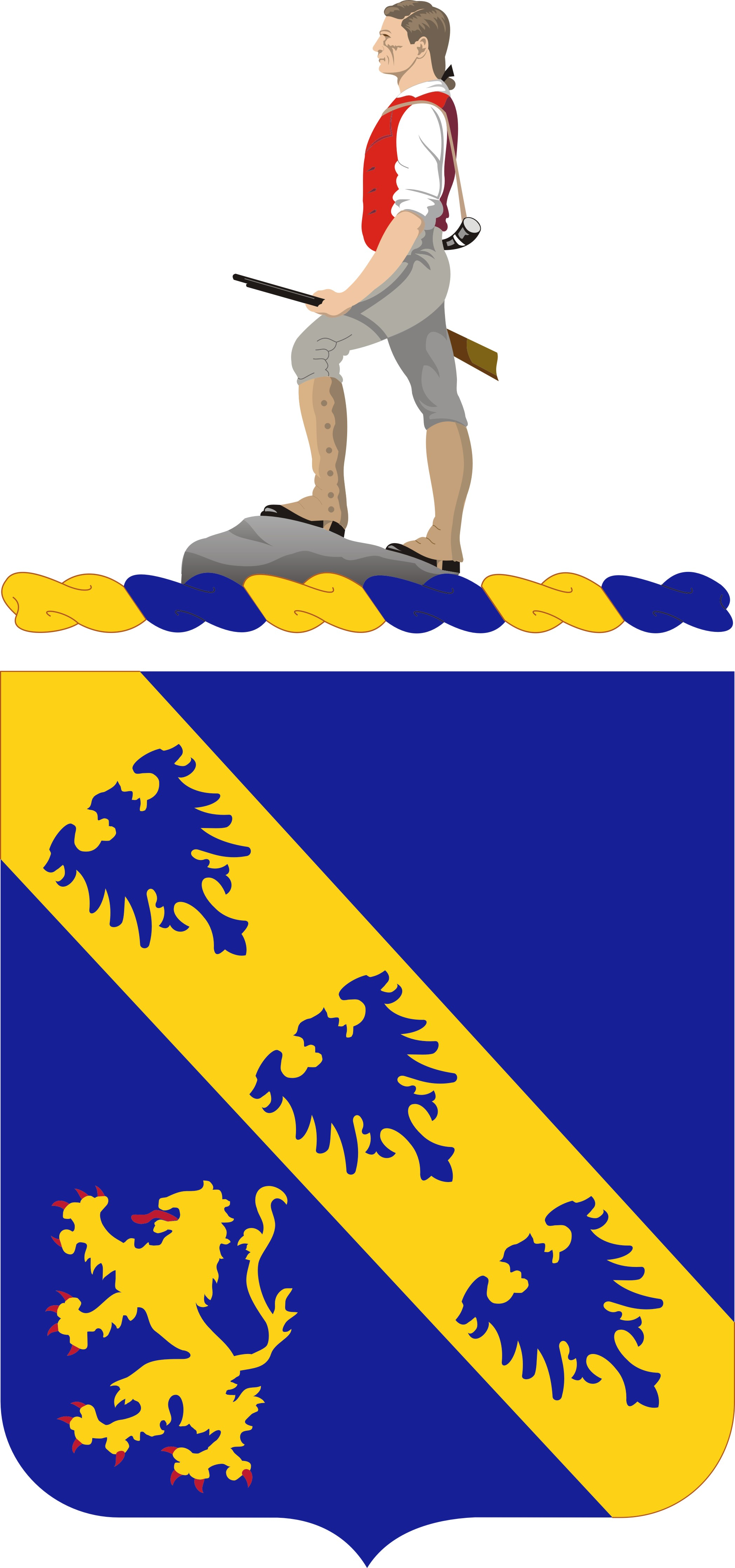
- coat of arms
- Active: 1917
- Country: United States
- Branch: United States Army Reserve
- Type: Infantry
- Mottos: "Armis et Animis" (By Arms and By Courage)

Commanders
- Colonel of the Regiment: Henry G. Fischer

Insignia
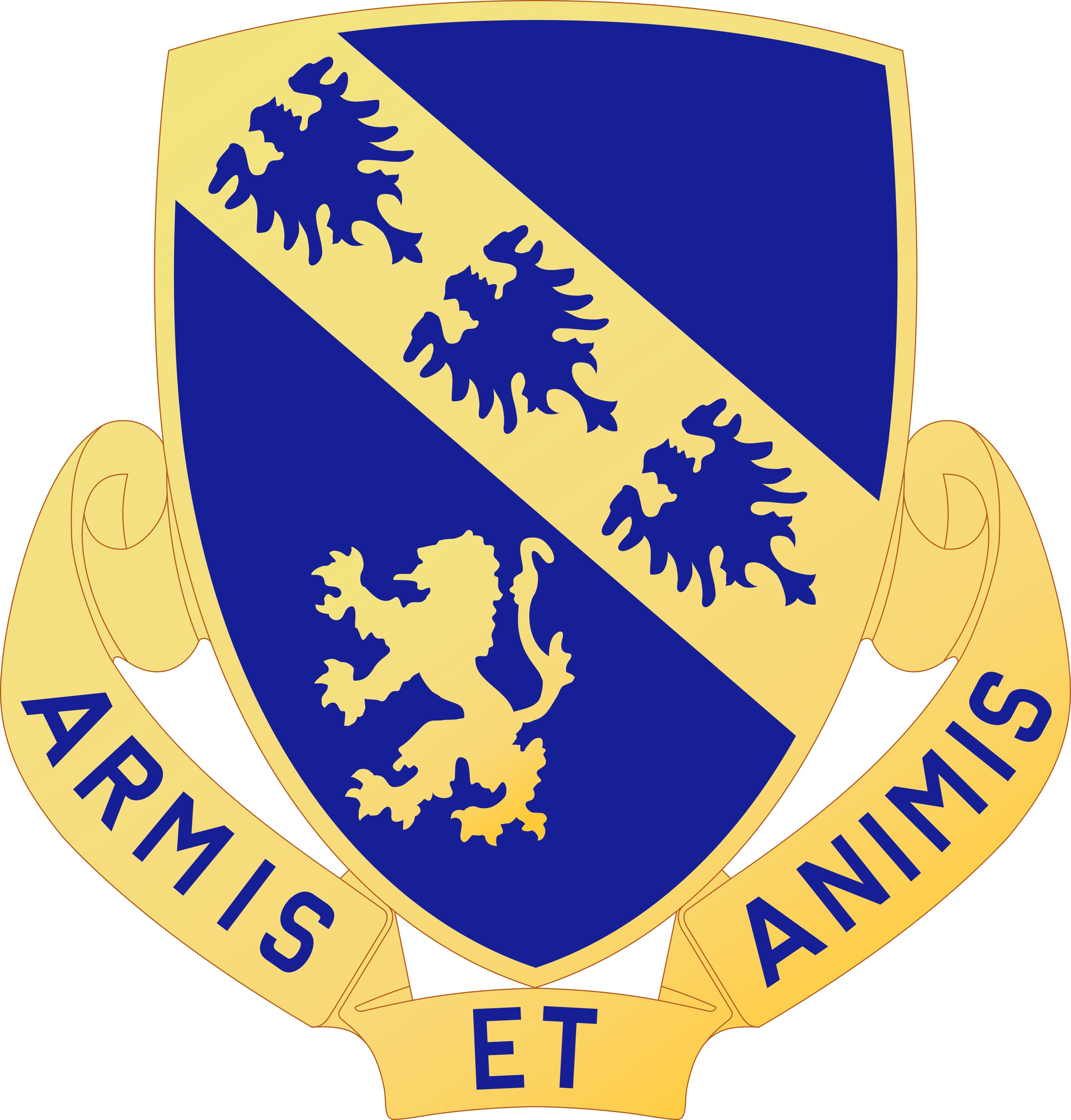
- Distinctive unit insignia

The 317th Infantry Regiment was a regiment of the United States Army during World War II. It was one of three infantry regiments in the 80th Infantry Division. Today, it is known as the 317th Regiment and is based in Lynchburg, Virginia as a training unit within the United States Army Reserve - currently under the 104th Training Division.

== History ==
=== World War I ===
The 317th Infantry was constituted on 5 August 1917 in the National Army and assigned to the 80th Division. It was organized from 23–27 August 1917 at Camp Lee, Virginia. The 317th Infantry arrived at the port of Newport News on 2 June 1919 on the USS Nansemond, and was demobilized 13–14 June 1919 at Camp Lee, Virginia.

=== Interwar period ===
The 317th Infantry was reconstituted in the Organized Reserve on 24 June 1921, assigned to the 80th Division, and allotted to the Third Corps Area. The regiment was initiated on 19 October 1921 with regimental headquarters at Lynchburg, Virginia. Subordinate battalion headquarters were concurrently organized as follows: 1st Battalion at Lynchburg; 2nd Battalion at Roanoke, Virginia; and 3rd Battalion at Staunton, Virginia. The regiment conducted summer training most years with the 12th and 34th Infantry Regiments at Fort George G. Meade or Fort Washington, Maryland, or Fort Eustis, Virginia. As an alternate form of summer training, it also conducted infantry Citizens Military Training Camps some years at Fort Meade or Fort Eustis. The primary ROTC "feeder" schools for new Reserve lieutenants for the regiment were the Virginia Polytechnic Institute and the Virginia Military Institute.

=== World War II ===
The regiment was first commanded by Colonel A. Donald Cameron. In October, 1944, he was replaced by Colonel Warfield M. Lewis. The final commander of the regiment, appointed in December, 1944, was Lieutenant Colonel Henry G. Fisher, who served in this capacity until the end of the war. The unit was inactivated on 10 January 1946 at Camp Kilmer in New Jersey.

=== Cold War ===
After World War II, the parent 80th Division was reactivated as airborne, and the 317th was redesignated on 15 July 1946 as the 317th Parachute Infantry, an element of the 80th Airborne Division. It was redesignated again only months later on 23 September 1946 as the 317th Glider Infantry and then activated on 14 November 1946 in the Organized Reserves with headquarters at Washington, D.C. On 5 October 1950 it was reorganized and redesignated as the 317th Airborne Infantry, but this was not to last. Maintaining airborne status in Reserve units proved to be extremely difficult, and on 10 May 1952 the unit was reorganized and redesignated as the 317th Infantry.

Switching from a focus on combat to a training role, the unit was reorganized and redesignated on 6 March 1959 as the 317th Regiment, an element of the 80th Division (Training), with headquarters at Washington, D.C. (The location of the headquarters changed on 1 December 1960 to Riverdale, Maryland.) On 31 January 1968 the 317th was reorganized to consist of the 1st, 2d, and 3d Battalions, elements of the 80th Division (Training). It was reorganized several more times to remain within a training focus:

- in 1994 it was assigned to the 80th Division (Institutional Training);
- in 2007 it was assigned to the 95th Division (Institutional Training);
- in 2008 it was assigned to the 98th Division (Institutional Training).

The most current reorganization was in 2016 to the 104th Training Division (Leader Training). The regiment currently consists of a single battalion – 2nd Battalion, 317th Regiment, which is a drill sergeant battalion headquartered in Lynchburg, Virginia. The battalion has a mission of conducting Cadet Summer Training (CST) for Reserve Officer's Training Corps (ROTC) basic (first-year) cadets at Fort Knox, Kentucky. The battalion has six drill sergeant companies, located in Charlottesville, Virginia (A Co), Salem, Virginia (B Co), Charleston, West Virginia (C Co), Lynchburg, Virginia (D Co), Culpeper, Virginia (E Co), and Dublin, Virginia (F Co).

== Lineage ==
- Constituted 5 August 1917 in the National Army (USA) as the 317th Infantry and assigned to the 80th Division
- Organized 23–27 August 1917 at Camp Lee, Virginia
- Demobilized 13–14 June at Camp Lee, Virginia
- Reconstituted 24 June 1921 in the Organized Reserves as the 317th Infantry and assigned to the 80th Division (later redesignated as the 80th Infantry Division)
- Organized in November 1921 with headquarters at Lynchburg, Virginia
- Ordered into active military service 15 July 1942 and reorganized at Camp Forrest, Tennessee
- Inactivated 10 January 1946 at Camp Kilmer, New Jersey
- Redesignated 15 July 1946 as the 317th Parachute Infantry, an element of the 80th Airborne Division
- Redesignated 23 September 1946 as the 317th Glider Infantry
- Activated 14 November 1946 in the Organized Reserves with headquarters at Washington, D.C.
- (Organized Reserves redesignated 25 March 1948 as the Organized Reserve Corps; redesignated 9 July 1952 as the Army Reserve)
- Reorganized and redesignated 5 October 1950 as the 317th Airborne Infantry
- Reorganized and redesignated 10 May 1952 as the 317th Infantry, an element of the 80th Infantry Division
- Reorganized and redesignated 6 March 1959 as the 317th Regiment, an element of the 80th Division (Training), with headquarters at Washington, D.C.
- (Location of headquarters changed 1 December 1960 to Riverdale, Maryland)
- Reorganized 31 January 1968 to consist of the 1st, 2nd, and 3rd Battalions, elements of the 80th Division (Training)
- Reorganized 1 October 1994 to consist of the 1st, 2nd, and 3rd Battalions, elements of the 80th Division (Institutional Training)
- Reorganized 1 October 2007 to consist of the 1st and 2nd Battalions, elements of the 95th Division (Institutional Training)
- Reorganized 1 October 2008 to consist of the 1st and 2nd Battalions, elements of the 98th Division (Institutional Training)
- Reorganized 1 October 2016 to consist of the 2nd Battalion, element of the 104th Division (Leader Training)

== Distinctive unit insignia ==
- Description

A Gold color metal and enamel device 1 5/32 inches (2.9 cm) in height consisting of a shield blazoned: Azure, on a bend Or three alerions of the field, in base a lion rampant of the second. Attached below and to the sides of the shield a tripartite Gold scroll inscribed "ARMIS" to dexter, "ET" in base and "ANIMIS" to sinister, all in Blue letters.

- Symbolism

The shield is blue for Infantry. The bend and alerions are taken from the coat of arms of Lorraine, but the tinctures are changed, and the lion represents service in the Picardy Sector. The motto translates to "By Arms and By Courage."

- Background

The distinctive unit insignia was originally approved for the 317th Infantry Regiment, Organized Reserves on 26 February 1927. It was redesignated for the 317th Airborne Infantry Regiment, Organized Reserve Corps on 23 April 1952. It was redesignated for the 317th Infantry Regiment, Organized Reserve Corps on 21 August 1952. The insignia was redesignated for the 317th Regiment, Army Reserve on 8 August 1960.

== Coat of arms ==
Blazon

- Shield- Azure, on a bend Or three alerions of the field, in base a lion rampant of the second.
- Crest- That for the regiments and separate battalions of the Army Reserve: On a wreath of the colors Or and Azure the Lexington Minute Man Proper. The statue of the Minute Man, Captain John Parker (H.H. Kitson, sculptor), stands on the Common in Lexington, Massachusetts.
- Motto ARMIS ET ANIMIS (By Arms and By Courage).

Symbolism

- Shield- The shield is blue for Infantry. The bend and alerions are taken from the coat of arms of Lorraine, but the tinctures are changed, and the lion represents service in the Picardy Sector.
- Crest- The crest is that of the United States Army Reserve.

Background- The coat of arms was originally approved for the 317th Infantry Regiment, Organized Reserves on 28 February 1927. It was redesignated for the 317th Airborne Infantry Regiment, Organized Reserve Corps on 23 April 1952. It was redesignated for the 317th Infantry Regiment, Organized Reserve Corps on 21 August 1952. The insignia was redesignated for the 317th Regiment, Army Reserve on 8 August 1960.
