= 108th Training Command =

US Army Reserve training unit

Coordinates: 35.2185°N 80.8063°W

- 108th Division shoulder sleeve insignia
- Founded: 15 July 1946–1 March 1952 (108th Airborne Div.); 1 March 1952–30 April 1959 (108th Infantry Div.); 30 April 1959–16 September 2008 (108th Training Div.); 16 September 2008–2026 (108th Training Cmd.)
- Country: United States
- Type: Initial entry and leader training
- Size: Command
- Part of: United States Army Reserve; U.S. Army Reserve Command
- Garrison/HQ: Charlotte, NC
- Nickname: Golden Griffins
- Motto: Princeps Excerendo
- Colors: Red and gold
- Engagements: Persian Gulf War; Global War on Terrorism

Commanders
- Current commander: Major General David Samuelsen
- Command Sergeant Major: CSM Christopher Luchsinger

Insignia
- 108th Training Command DUI

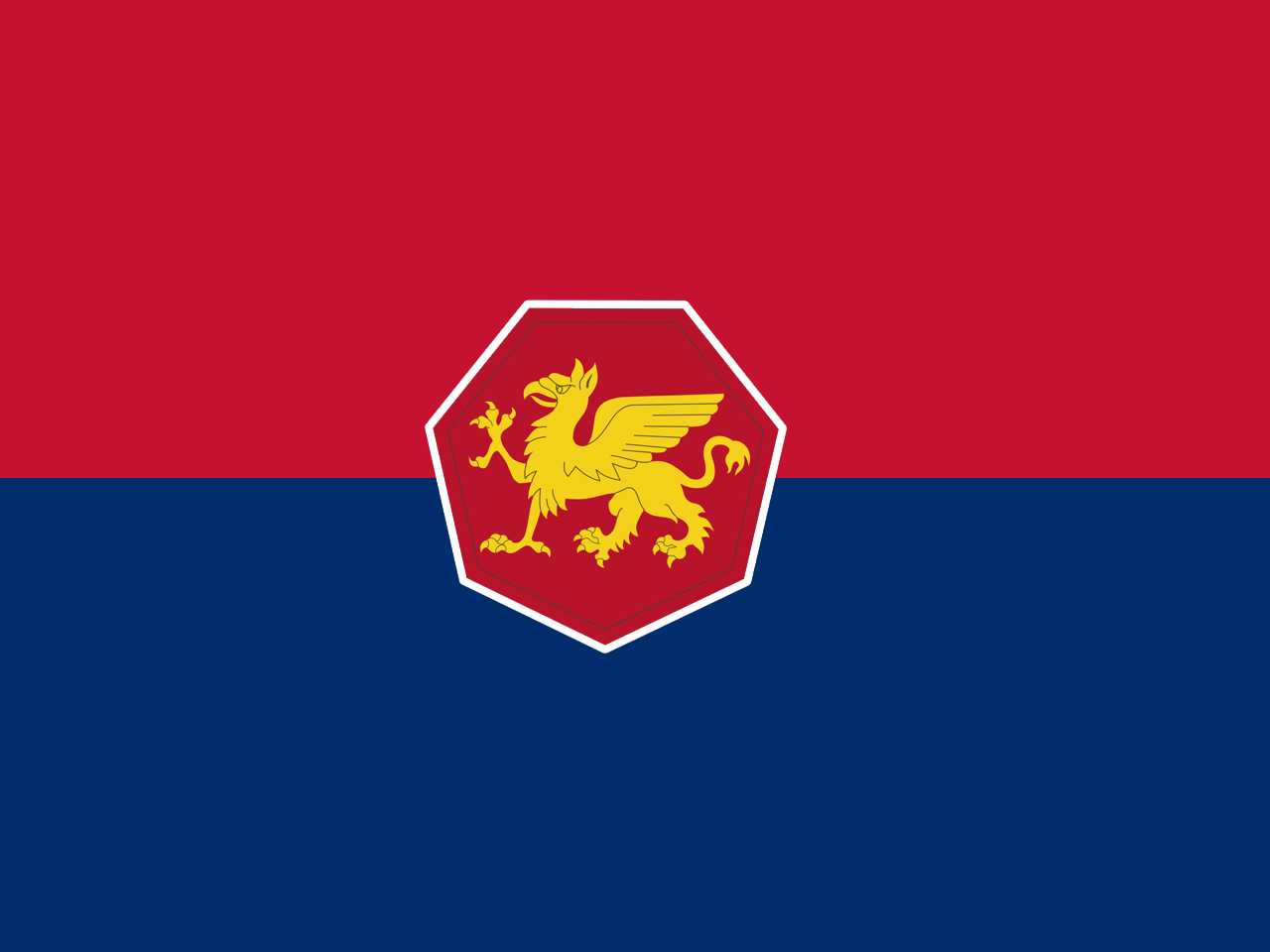
- Flag of the United States Army 108th Training Division

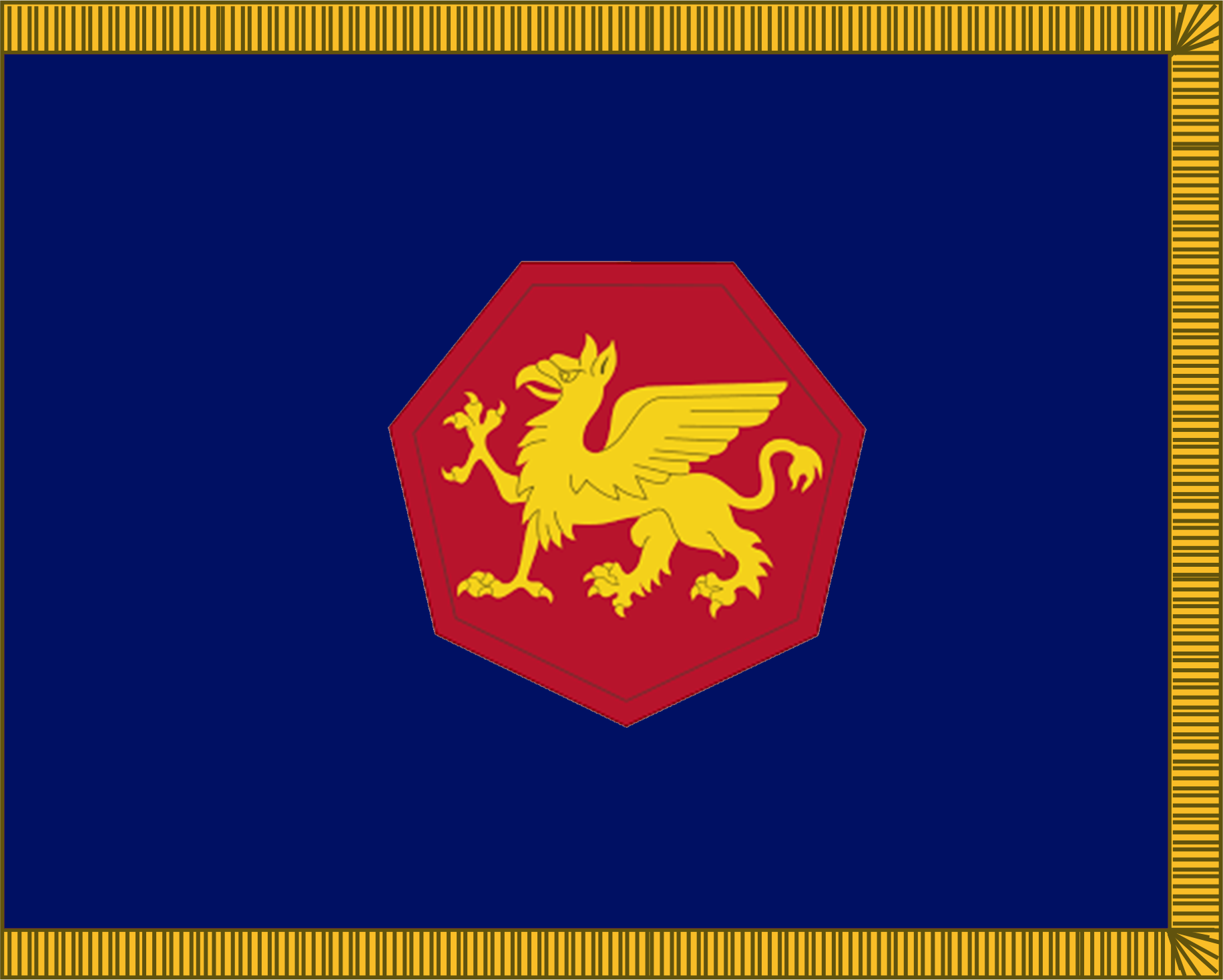
- 108th Training Command Flag

The 108th Training Command was a United States Army Reserve unit headquartered in Charlotte, North Carolina.

It was activated in 1946 as the 108th Airborne Division, redesignated the 108th Infantry Division in 1952, and redesignated again as the 108th Division (Institutional Training) in 1956. Under the U.S. Army Reserve Transformation of 2005, it was reorganized as the 108th Training Command, which provides Initial Entry Training to recruits of the United States Army Reserve.

Today, the command is one of the largest in the Army Reserve, commanding and coordinating 9,000 soldiers. It mans, trains, equips, and deploys drill sergeants, ROTC adjunct faculty, and cadet summer training capabilities to support Army force-generation objectives and, on order, provides command-and-control capabilities for units as large as divisions.

Over its 75-year history, the 108th has been called upon to pilot new missions for the Army and Army Reserve and develop and pioneer training methods and policies.

On September 27, 2026, 108th training command held its inactivation ceremony from Charlotte, NC. This ceremony had recognize the dedication, achievements, and countless contributions of the 108th Training Command throughout its proud history. Some of its functions were transferred to the 80th Training Command.

== History ==
=== Early history ===
The Division was activated in 1946 as the 108th Airborne Division of the United States Army Reserve and was headquartered in Atlanta, Georgia. The division's numbering followed in sequence with the 107th Infantry Division, a planned African American infantry division that had been constituted on the Army's troop list during World War II, but was never activated.

Manning during this period was relatively small and funding for airborne training, equipment, and airlift support was minimal. In 1952, the division was reorganized into an infantry division and its headquarters was moved to its present location in Charlotte, North Carolina with all its subordinate units located in either North or South Carolina. In 1954, the division helped test a new method of rifle qualification known as "trainfire." In 1956, the division was selected to serve as a prototype for an Army Training Division. This meant reorganizing again to conduct basic and advanced individual training, should the division be called to active duty.

==== Units (1946–1956) ====
- Headquarters
- Special Troops
  - Headquarters, Special Troops
  - Headquarters Company, 108th Airborne Division
  - 108th Airborne Division Band
  - Military Police Platoon, 108th Airborne Division
  - Reconnaissance Platoon, 108th Airborne Division
  - 808th Airborne Ordnance Maintenance Company
  - 108th Airborne Quartermaster Company
  - 108th Airborne Signal Company
- 485th Glider Infantry Regiment (1946–1952)
- 518th Parachute Infantry Regiment
- 519th Parachute Infantry Regiment (1946–1952)
- 321st Infantry Regiment (1952–1956)
- 323rd Infantry Regiment (1952–1956)
- 108th Airborne Division Artillery
  - Headquarters & Headquarters Battery
  - 506th Parachute Field Artillery Battalion
  - 507th Parachute Field Artillery Battalion
  - 581st Glider Field Artillery Battalion
  - 582nd Glider Field Artillery Battalion
- 598th Airborne Engineer Battalion
- 353d Airborne Medical Company
- 651st Airborne Antiaircraft Battalion
- 108th Parachute Maintenance Company

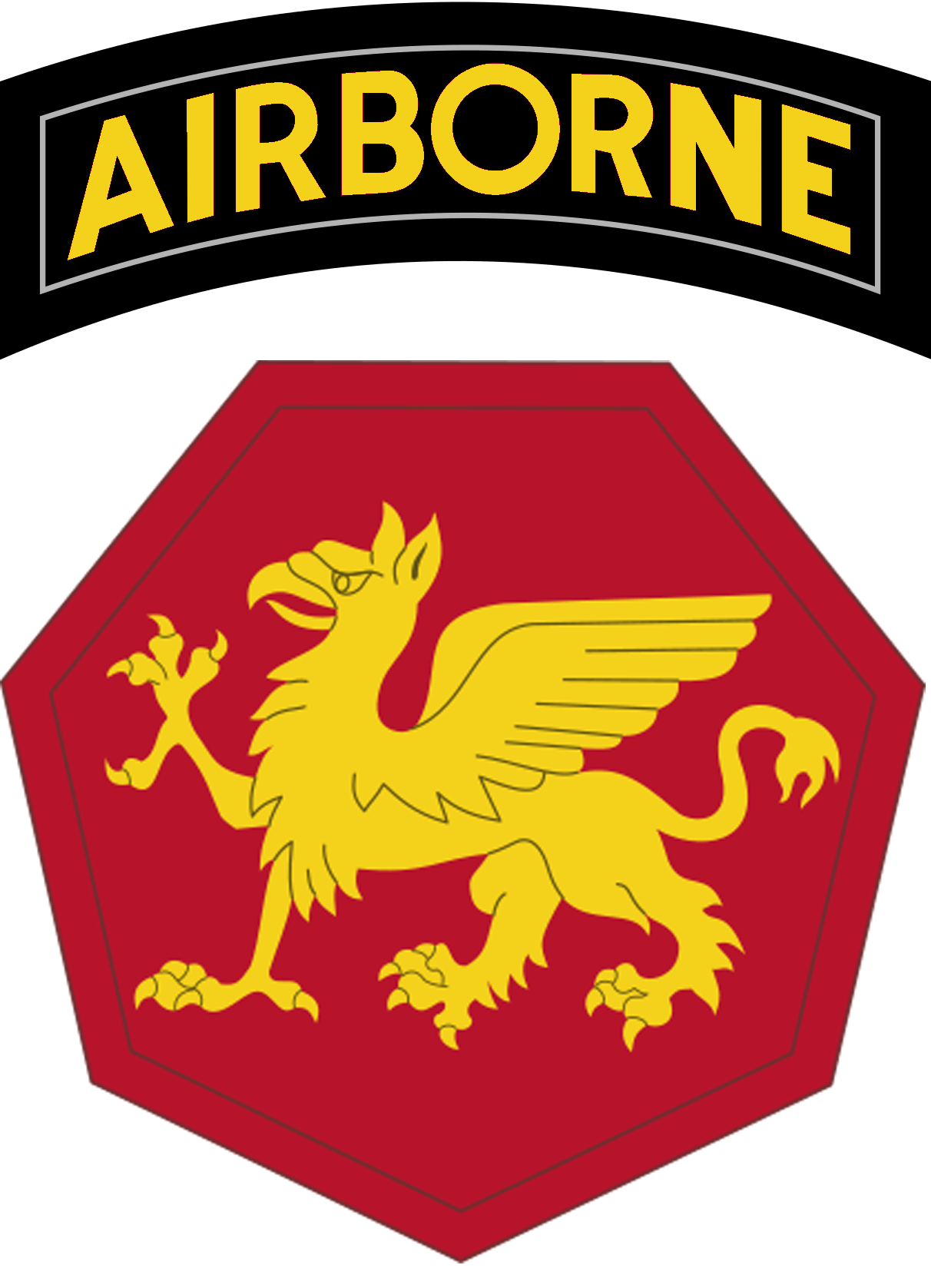
Shoulder sleeve insignia of the 108th Airborne Division (1946–1952).

Note: In 1952 the 108th Airborne Division was reorganized and redesignated as the 108th Infantry Division. The 519th, reorganized as infantry, was reassigned to the 81st Infantry Division and the 485th, also reorganized as infantry, was reassigned to the 87th Infantry Division. Concurrently, the 321st and 323d Infantry Regiments were reassigned from the 81st to the 108th. Source: U.S. Army Center of Military History, Fort McNair, Washington, DC

=== Vietnam ===
In the 1960s, the division established its own drill sergeant school patterned after the active component school. In 1968, the 108th Division was restructured into brigades. During the Vietnam era, 108th Division soldiers during annual training were used to conduct interim training for soldiers waiting to begin basic training. In the 1980s the division developed an updated and more practical mobilization plan. During those same years the division began conducting basic training by themselves at Fort Jackson under new Mobilization Army Training Center and Provisional Training concepts.

=== End of the Cold War ===
In January 1991, more than 300 108th Division soldiers were called to active duty to support Operation Desert Storm, marking the first mobilization ever for members of the 108th Division. The soldiers assisted in the retraining of individual soldiers at Fort Jackson who were recalled up to military duty. In late 1993, the 108th Division accepted the mission to pilot a new concept in Army training called Future Army Schools Twenty-first Century. This not only expanded the geographic size of the 108th Division to add the states of Georgia and Florida, but added 10 new US Army Reserve Forces schools to the division's force structure. Those schools were later reorganized into functionally aligned school brigades.

This gave the 108th Division a new mission. While keeping its mission of conducting initial entry training for new soldiers entering the Army, it now conducts specialized skill training for thousands of soldiers, both officers and enlisted, in the southeastern part of the United States.

In 1996 the 108th Division was assigned another completely new mission to conduct Reserve Officer Training Corps training at three colleges and universities in Florida, Georgia and South Carolina. That program has been expanded nationally. In October 1998, 108th Division assumed command and control of the former 265th US Army Forces School in Puerto Rico, which added an 8th Brigade. In 2001, the ROTC structure was officially designated the division's 9th Brigade. In 2004, a reorganization of the Army Reserve resulted in the 108th Division expanding into Alabama and Mississippi.

=== 21st century ===
Between 2001 and 2007 over 2,000 soldiers from the division have mobilized and deployed in support of the Iraq War. The division began its biggest mobilization since the Second World War. Almost 1,000 soldiers from across the United States deployed to Iraq and Kuwait to help train, maintain, and sustain the Iraqi Armed Forces and Iraqi Police as part of the President's efforts to exit from Iraq.

The 108th Division had 4,000 soldiers assigned to units over 300,000 square miles (780,000 km^{2}) in North Carolina, South Carolina, Georgia, Mississippi, Alabama, Florida and Puerto Rico in 23 cities and towns.

In 2008, the command was reorganized and given responsibility for three subordinate divisions, the 95th Training Division (Initial Entry Training) based at Fort Sill, Oklahoma, the 98th Training Division (Initial Entry Training) based at Fort Moore, Georgia and the 104th Training Division (Leader Training) based at Fort Lewis, Washington, plus the USAR Drill Sergeants' School. It became one of the largest in the Army Reserve, it supports initial military training and ROTC leader training. Currently it has over 10,000 soldiers assigned throughout the United States, Guam, and Puerto Rico.

== Organization ==
The 108th Training Command is a subordinate functional command of the United States Army Reserve Command. As of January 2026 the command consists of the following units:

- 108th Training Command, in Charlotte (NC)
  - 95th Training Division (IET), at Fort Sill (OK)
    - 1st Brigade (IET), at Fort Sill (OK)
      - 1st Battalion, 354th Regiment (MP OSUT), in Tulsa (OK)
      - 2nd Battalion, 354th Regiment (BCT), in Grand Prairie (TX)
      - 1st Battalion, 355th Regiment (BCT), in Round Rock (TX)
      - 2nd Battalion, 377th Regiment (BCT), in Lincoln (NE)
      - 3rd Battalion, 378th Regiment (BCT), in Norman (OK)
      - 2nd Battalion, 379th Regiment (TS), at Fort Sill (OK)
    - 2nd Brigade (BCT), in Vancouver (WA)
      - 2nd Battalion, 413th Regiment (BCT), at March Air Reserve Base (CA)
      - 1st Battalion, 415th Regiment (BCT), in Phoenix (AZ)
      - 3rd Battalion, 415th Regiment (BCT), at Fairchild Air Force Base (WA)
    - 3rd Brigade (IET), in Beaver Dam (WI)
      - 1st Battalion, 320th Regiment (MP OSUT), in Abingdon (VA)
      - 1st Battalion, 330th Regiment (BCT), in Fort Wayne (IN)
      - 2nd Battalion, 330th Regiment (EN OSUT), in Arlington Heights (IL)
      - 1st Battalion, 334th Regiment (TS), in Milwaukee (WI)
      - 3rd Battalion, 334th Regiment (BCT), in Milwaukee (WI)
      - 1st Battalion, 390th Regiment (EN OSUT), in Amherst (NY)
  - 98th Training Division (IET), at Fort Benning (GA)
    - 1st Brigade (MT), at Fort Benning (GA)
      - 3rd Battalion, 330th Regiment (IN OSUT), at Livonia (MI)
      - 2nd Battalion, 398th Regiment (CAV OSUT), in Madisonville (KY)
      - 2nd Battalion, 415th Regiment (CAV OSUT), at Camp Parks (CA)
      - 3rd Battalion, 485th Regiment (IN OSUT), at Fort Benning (GA)
      - 4th Battalion, 518th Regiment (TS), at Maxwell Air Force Base (AL)
    - 2nd Brigade (BCT), at Fort Jackson (SC)
      - 1st Battalion, 321st Regiment (BCT), at Fort Jackson (SC)
      - 3rd Battalion, 321st Regiment (TS), at Fort Jackson (SC)
      - 3rd Battalion, 323rd Regiment (BCT), in Athens (GA)
      - 4th Battalion, 323rd Regiment (BCT), in Montgomery (AL)
      - 2nd Battalion, 485th Regiment (BCT), in Orlando (FL)
      - 3rd Battalion, 518th Regiment (BCT), in Hickory (NC)
    - 3rd Brigade (BCT), in Amherst (NY)
      - 1st Battalion, 304th Regiment (BCT), in Londonderry (NH)
      - 2nd Battalion, 389th Regiment (BCT), in Horseheads (NY)
      - 2nd Battalion, 417th Regiment (BCT), in Danbury (CT)
  - 104th Training Division (LT), at Joint Base Lewis–McChord (WA)
    - 1st Brigade (LT), in Aurora (CO)
      - 2nd Battalion, 319th Regiment (CST), in Salem (VA)
      - 4th Battalion, 399th Regiment (CST), at Fort Knox (KY)
      - 4th Battalion, 413th Regiment (SROTC EAST), at Fort Knox (KY)
      - 3rd Battalion, 414th Regiment (CST), at Joint Base Lewis–McChord (WA)
      - 4th Battalion, 414th Regiment (SROTC WEST), at Joint Base Lewis–McChord (WA)
    - 2nd Brigade (LT), in Lexington (KY)
      - 3rd Battalion, 304th Regiment (USMA), in Saco (ME)
      - 2nd Battalion, 317th Regiment (BCT), in Lynchburg (VA)
      - 2nd Battalion, 397th Regiment (BCT), in Lexington (KY)
      - 1st Battalion, 398th Regiment (BCT), in Owensboro (KY)

Abbreviations: IET — Initial Entry Training; BCT — Basic Combat Training; OSUT — One Station Unit Training; MP — Military Police; EN — Engineer; IN — Infantry; CAV — Cavalry; TS — Training Support; MT — Maneuver Tactics; LT — Leader Training; CST — Cadet Summer Training; SROTC — Senior Reserve Officers' Training Corps; USMA — United States Military Academy

== Former Commanding Generals ==
- MG William B. Dyer III (November 2022 - October 2024)
- MG Andrew J. Juknelis (February 2020 - November 2022)
- MG Kate K. Leahy (October 2018 - February 2020)
- MG Mark T. McQueen (October 2015 - October 2018)
- MG Leslie A. Purser (July 2013 – October 2015)
- MG Robert P. Stall (June 2010 – July 2013)
- MG James B. Mallory, III (March 2007 – June 2010)
- MG Charles E. McCartney Jr. (March 2003 – March 2007)
- MG H. Douglas Robertson (March 1999 – March 2003)
- MG George W. Goldsmith Jr. (March 1995 – March 1999)
- MG Ronald E. Sneed (March 1991 – March 1995)
- MG William A. Gantt Jr. (August 1987 – March 1991)
- MG Charles J. Whisnant (August 1983 – August 1987)
- MG Berlyn K. Sutton (September 1980 – August 1983)
- MG Paul S. Oliver (December 1976 – September 1980)
- MG Scott S. Ferebee (December 1969 – December 1976)
- MG Ian M. Davidson (February 1966 – December 1969)
- MG Thomas Thorne (September 1965 – February 1966)
- MG Robert M. Jones (June 1960 – June 1965)
- MG Thomas M. Mayfield (March 1952 – June 1960)

== Notable soldiers of the 108th Training Command ==
- SFC Kenneth W. Cabe, 108th Leadership Academy, 1977 Drill Sergeant of the Year
- SFC Harold D. Cline, 108th Div., 1973 Drill Sergeant of the Year
- SGT Devin M. Crawford, 1st BDE, 95th Div., 2018 Drill Sergeant of the Year (DSOY).
- SFC Edward E. Enfinger, 108th Div., 1981 Drill Sergeant of the Year
- CSM Michael D. Schultz former USARC Command Sergeant Major.
- Lieutenant General Jack C. Stultz Jr., former Chief, Army Reserve (CAR)/Commanding General, United States Army Reserve Command (USARC).
