= 518th Infantry Regiment =

- coat of arms
- Active: 1946-present
- Country: United States
- Branch: Infantry Branch (United States)
- Type: Infantry
- Size: Regiment
- Part of: United States Army Reserve
- Mottos: VIRTUS, FIDES, HONOR (Courage, Faith, Honor)

The 518th Infantry Regiment is an Infantry regiment in the Army Reserve.

The regiment was constituted 15 July 1946 in the Organized Reserves as the 518th Parachute Infantry and assigned to the 108th Airborne Division.

- Activated 6 August 1946 with headquarters at Charlotte, North Carolina
- (Organized Reserves redesignated 25 March 1948 as the Organized Reserve Corps; redesignated 9 July 1952 as the Army Reserve)
- Reorganized and redesignated 28 February 1951 as the 518th Airborne Infantry
- Reorganized and redesignated 1 March 1952 as the 518th Infantry, an element of the 108th Infantry Division
- Reorganized and redesignated 30 April 1959 as the 518th Regiment, an element of the 108th Division (Training), with headquarters at Charlotte, North Carolina
- Reorganized 31 January 1968 to consist of the 1st, 2d, and 3d Battalions, elements of the 108th Division (Training)
- Reorganized 1 October 1994 to consist of the 1st, 2d, and 3d Battalions, elements of the 108th Division (Institutional Training)
- Reorganized 13 January 1995 to consist of the 1st and 3d Battalions, elements of the 108th Division (Institutional Training)
- Reorganized 16 November 1996 to consist of the 1st, 2d, and 3d Battalions, elements of the 108th Division (Institutional Training)
- Activated on or prior to March 2003 B co, 3-518, to train BCT recruits at Fort Jackson, SC. Attached at that time to the Black Lions for the purpose of that training.

== Distinctive unit insignia ==
- Description

A Silver color metal and enamel device 1 1/8 inches (2.9 cm) in height overall consisting of a shield blazoned: Per chevron Argent and Azure, in chief a palmetto and a long leaf pine of the second, in base a hornet Volant of the first. Attached below and to the sides of the shield is a Silver scroll inscribed "VIRTUS FIDES HONOR" in Blue letters.

- Symbolism

The colors blue and white are used for Infantry. The palmetto and pine tree represent South Carolina and North Carolina, the home area of the Regiment. The hornet is used in allusion to Charlotte, North Carolina, the unit’s headquarters; Lord Cornwallis having referred to it during the Revolution as a hornet’s nest." The motto translates to "Courage, Faith, Honor."

- Background

The distinctive unit insignia was originally approved for the 518th Infantry Regiment on 19 January 1956. It was redesignated for the 518th Regiment on 23 May 1960.

== Coat of arms ==
=== Blazon ===
- Shield

Per chevron Argent and Azure, in chief a palmetto and a long leaf pine of the second, in base a hornet Volant of the first.

- Crest

That for the regiments and separate battalions of the Army Reserve: On a wreath of the colors Argent and Azure, the Lexington Minute Man Proper. The statue of the Minute Man, Captain John Parker (H.H. Kitson, sculptor), stands on the Common in Lexington, Massachusetts. Motto VIRTUS, FIDES, HONOR (Courage, Faith, Honor).

=== Symbolism ===
- Shield

The colors blue and white are used for Infantry. The palmetto and pine tree represent South Carolina and North Carolina, the home area of the Regiment. The hornet is used in allusion to Charlotte, North Carolina, the unit’s headquarters; Lord Cornwallis having referred to it during the Revolution as a hornet’s nest."

- Crest

The crest is that of the United States Army Reserve.

=== Background ===
The coat of arms was originally approved for the 518th Infantry Regiment on 19 January 1956. It was redesignated for the 518th Regiment on 23 May 1960.

== Campaign streamers ==
none

== Decorations ==
none
