= 98th Training Division =

- 98th Infantry Division shoulder sleeve insignia
- Active: 23 July 1918–November 1918 (National Army); 24 June 1921–16 February 1946 (Organized Reserves); 19 December 1946–1 May 1959 (Army Reserve); 1 May 1959–present (98th Training Div.)
- Country: United States
- Branch: United States Army Reserve
- Type: Training
- Size: Division
- Part of: 108th Training Command
- Garrison/HQ: Fort Benning, Georgia
- Nickname: "Iroquois" (special designation)
- Engagements: World War II; Asiatic-Pacific Theater

Commanders
- Current commander: Brigadier General Gregory D. Glasow
- Command Sergeant Major: CSM James Lamberson

Insignia
- Distinctive unit insignia

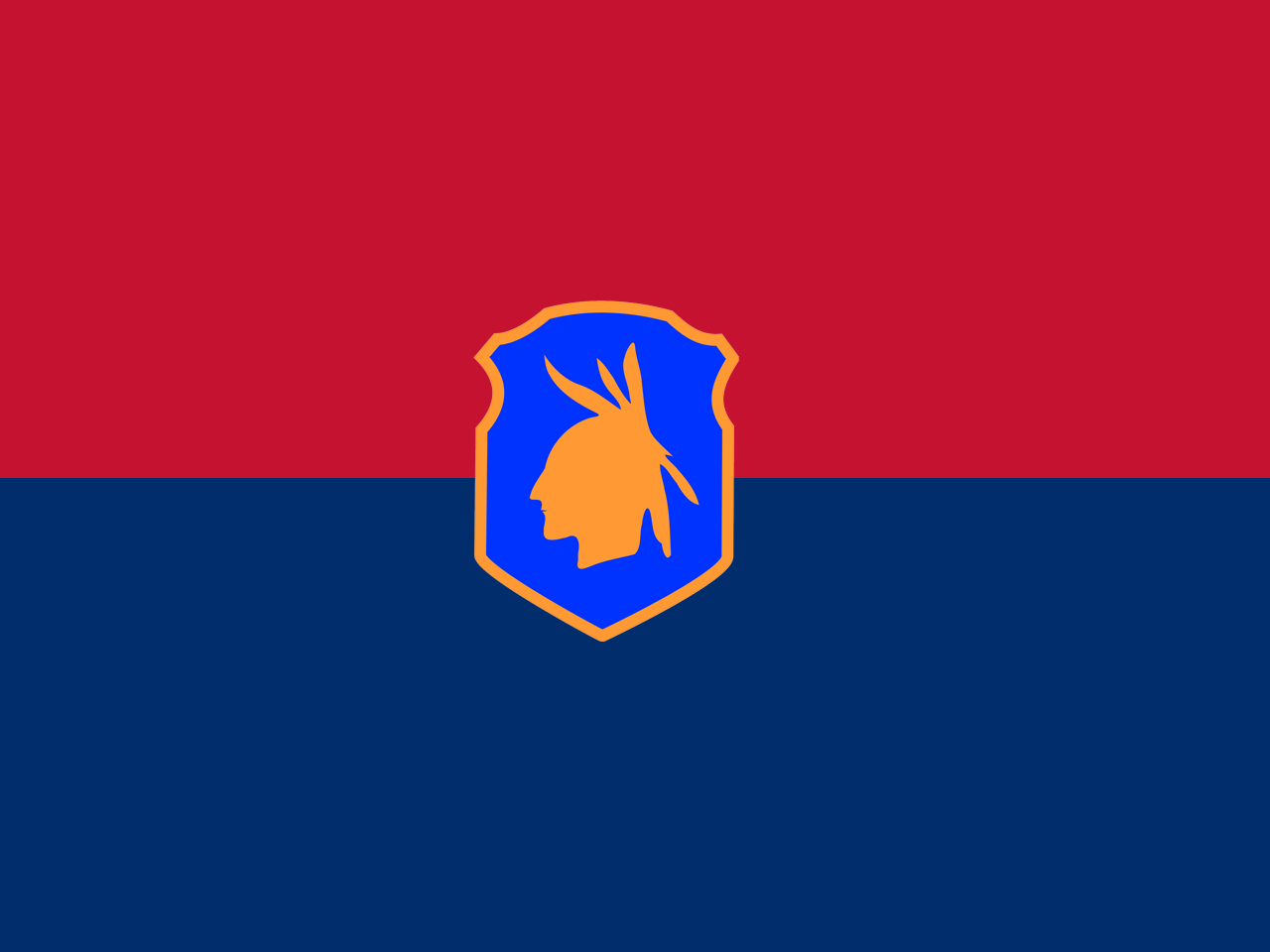
- Flag of the United States Army 98th Infantry Division

The 98th Infantry Division ("Iroquois") was a unit of the United States Army in the closing months of World War I and during World War II. Today it exists as the 98th Training Division, a component of the United States Army Reserve headquartered at Fort Benning, Georgia. The 98th Training Division provides Initial Entry Training (IET) to new United States Army Reserve recruits. It is one of three training divisions subordinate to the 108th Training Command and handles command and control of units throughout the eastern United States.

Since its creation in 1918, the division has experienced multiple cycles of activation, training, deployment and deactivation as well as substantial reorganizations and changes of mission. Since 1959, the 98th has been a unit of the U.S. Army Reserve with the primary mission of training soldiers. Long headquartered in Rochester, New York, with historical ties to New York and New England, the division was moved in 2012 to Fort Benning, Georgia.

The division was stood down and rendered inactive on 21 October 2026, while its heritage is carried on by the 98th Army Reserve Readiness Training Center at Fort McCoy in Wisconsin.

== History ==
=== World War I ===
On 23 July 1918, the War Department directed the organization of the 98th Division at Camp McClellan, Alabama. Plans called for the division to include a

headquarters, headquarters troop, the 195th Infantry Brigade (389th and 390th Infantry Regiments and 368th Machine Gun Battalion), 196th Infantry Brigade (391st and 392nd Infantry Regiments and 369th Machine Gun Battalion), 367th Machine Gun Battalion, 173rd Field Artillery Brigade (367th–369th Field Artillery Regiments and 26th Trench Mortar Battery), 323rd Engineers, 623rd Field Signal Battalion, and 323rd Train Headquarters and Military Police (Ammunition, Engineer, Sanitary, and Supply Trains). It was intended that the 195th Infantry Brigade would be organized in France from the 52nd and 53rd Pioneer Infantry Regiments.

The 26th Trench Mortar Battery was formed at Del Rio, Texas, in August 1918 and was assigned to the 173rd Field Artillery Brigade, but never ended up joining. The organization of the division began in October with the appointment of Colonel Jennings B. Wilson as division chief of staff, but organization never progressed beyond the assignment of the division staff and preliminary preparations for the receipt of Selective Service men. After the Armistice of 11 November 1918, the 98th Division was ordered demobilized on 30 November 1918.

=== Interwar period ===
The 98th Division was reconstituted in the Organized Reserve on 24 June 1921, allotted to the Second Corps Area, and assigned to the XII Corps. The division was further allotted to the upstate area of New York as its home area. The division headquarters was organized on 18 August 1921 at the Federal Building in Syracuse, New York, and remained there until activated for World War II. The designated mobilization and training station for the division was the Syracuse Concentration Area for all elements except the division artillery units, which would mobilize at Pine Camp, New York. From 1928 to 1940, the commander of the Second Corps Area designated the commander of the 1st Division's 2nd Infantry Brigade to perform additional duties as the commanding general of the 98th Division.

The 98th Division headquarters was called to duty for training as a unit on a number of occasions, usually for command post exercises (CPXs). The headquarters usually trained with the staff of the 2nd Infantry Brigade at Madison Barracks, New York, 1924–30 (with the exception of the 1927 annual training at Fort Niagara), and at Fort Ontario, New York, 1931–39, after the 2nd Infantry Brigade headquarters was moved to that post. In December 1932, the division conducted a CPX at Plattsburg Barracks, New York, with the staffs of the 2nd Infantry Brigade and the 26th Infantry Regiment.

The subordinate infantry regiments of the division generally held their summer training with the units of the 2nd Infantry Brigade at Plattsburg Barracks, Fort Niagara, or Fort Ontario. Other units, such as the special troops, artillery, engineers, aviation, medical, and quartermaster, trained at various posts in the Second and Third Corps Areas, usually with other units of the 1st Division. For example, the division's artillery trained with the 7th Field Artillery at Pine Camp; the 323rd Engineer Regiment usually trained with the 1st Engineer Regiment at Fort DuPont, Delaware; the 323rd Medical Regiment trained with the 1st Medical Regiment at Carlisle Barracks, Pennsylvania; and the 323rd Observation Squadron trained with the 5th Observation Squadron at Mitchel Field, New York. In addition to the unit training camps, the infantry regiments of the division rotated responsibility to conduct the Citizens Military Training Camps held at Plattsburg Barracks and Fort Niagara each year. On a number of occasions, the division participated in Second Corps Area and First Army CPXs in conjunction with other Regular Army, National Guard, and Organized Reserve units. The first of these CPXs was held by the Second Corps Area at Camp Dix, New Jersey, 7–21 July 1929, followed by several First Army CPXs in the years leading up to World War II.

Unlike the Regular and Guard units in the First Corps Area, the 98th Division did not participate in the various Second Corps Area maneuvers and the First Army maneuvers of 1935, 1939, and 1940 as an organized unit due to lack of enlisted personnel and equipment. Instead, the officers and a few enlisted reservists were assigned to Regular and Guard units to fill vacant slots and bring the units up to full peace strength for the exercises. Additionally, some officers were assigned duties as umpires or as support personnel.

=== World War II ===
==== Mobilization ====
Before Organized Reserve infantry divisions were ordered into active military service, they were reorganized on paper as "triangular" divisions under the 1940 tables of organization. The headquarters companies of the two infantry brigades were consolidated into the division's cavalry reconnaissance troop, and one infantry regiment was removed by inactivation. The field artillery brigade headquarters and headquarters battery became the headquarters and headquarters battery of the division artillery. Its three field artillery regiments were reorganized into four battalions; one battalion was taken from each of the two 75 mm gun regiments to form two 105 mm howitzer battalions, the brigade's ammunition train was reorganized as the third 105 mm howitzer battalion, and the 155 mm howitzer battalion was formed from the 155 mm howitzer regiment. The engineer, medical, and quartermaster regiments were reorganized into battalions. In 1942, divisional quartermaster battalions were split into ordnance light maintenance companies and quartermaster companies, and the division's headquarters and military police company, which had previously been a combined unit, was split. The 98th was ordered into active military service on 15 September 1942 at Camp Breckinridge, Kentucky, filling its ranks primarily with soldiers from New York and New England. The 98th spent the next 18 months training at Camp Breckinridge, Camp Forrest, Tennessee, and Camp Rucker, Alabama, for combat in the Pacific theater.

==== Division organization ====
The division consisted of the following units:

98th Infantry Division organization (click to enlarge)

- 98th Infantry Division
  - 98th Infantry Division Headquarters
  - 98th Cavalry Reconnaissance Troop (Mechanized) (M3 scout cars and then M8 Greyhound armored cars)
  - 389th Infantry Regiment
    - Headquarters and Headquarters Company
    - 3× Infantry battalions
      - each battalion consists of: 1× Headquarters and Headquarters Company, 3× Rifle companies, 1× Heavy Weapons Company
    - Cannon Company (T12 Gun Motor Carriages and T19 Howitzer Motor Carriages, later replaced by either M3 105mm towed howitzers or M7 Priest self propelled howitzers)
    - Anti-Tank Company (M3 37mm anti-tank guns, which were replaced by 1944 with M1 57mm anti-tank guns)
    - Service Company
  - 390th Infantry Regiment
    - same organization as 389th Infantry Regiment
  - 391st Infantry Regiment
    - same organization as 389th Infantry Regiment
  - 98th Infantry Division Artillery
    - Headquarters and Headquarters Battery
    - 367th Field Artillery Battalion
      - Headquarters and Headquarters Battery
      - 3× Batteries (M2 105mm towed howitzers)
      - Service Battery
    - 368th Field Artillery Battalion
      - same organization as 367th Field Artillery Battalion
    - 369th Field Artillery Battalion
      - Headquarters and Headquarters Battery
      - 3× Batteries (M1 155mm towed howitzers)
      - Service Battery
    - 923rd Field Artillery Battalion
      - same organization as 367th Field Artillery Battalion
  - Headquarters Special Troops
    - Headquarters Company, 98th Infantry Division
    - 98th Signal Company
    - 98th Quartermaster Company
    - 798th Ordnance Light Maintenance Company
    - Military Police Platoon
    - 98th Infantry Division Band (attached)
  - 323rd Engineer Combat Battalion
    - Headquarters and Headquarters and Service Company
    - 3× Engineer combat companies
  - 323rd Medical Battalion
    - Headquarters and Headquarters Detachment
    - 3× Collecting companies
    - Clearing Company

==== Hawaii ====
The roughly 19,590 soldiers of the 98th arrived in Oahu, Hawaii, on 19 April 1944, and relieved the 33rd Infantry Division of responsibility for the defense of the Hawaiian Islands. On 15 May 1945, the 98th was relieved of garrison duties by the 372nd Infantry Regiment, freeing them up to train for Operation Olympic, scheduled for 1 November 1945 as one of two planned invasions of Japan. Instead, the Japanese surrendered, and the 98th Infantry Division arrived in Japan on 27 September 1945. It served in Osaka as part of the occupying force until 16 February 1946 when the unit was inactivated.

Awards earned by 98th Infantry Division soldiers during this period include: Legion of Merit: 1; Soldier's Medal: 8; Bronze Star: 146.

Commanding generals during World War II:

- Major General Paul L. Ransom (September 1942 – November 1943)
- Major General George W. Griner Jr. (November 1943 – 26 June 1944)
- Major General Ralph C. Smith (15 July 1944 – 30 August 1944)
- Major General Arthur M. Harper (22 October 1944 – 16 February 1946)

=== Post-war ===
On 18 April 1947, the Iroquois Division was reactivated in Rochester, New York, on reserve status and began training for combat in the new Cold War environment. It had been previously planned to be an airborne division. A note on the troop list nevertheless indicated that the unit was to be reorganized and redesignated as an airborne unit upon mobilization and was to train as such.

The reorganization of 1 May 1959 redesignated the 98th Infantry Division as the 98th Division (Training) and set the unit on a course lasting to the present – training Soldiers. The regimental heritage was retained with the 389th, 390th and 391st Infantry Regiments organized as Basic Combat Training (BCT) regiments and the 392nd Infantry Regiment organized as an Advanced Individual Training (AIT) regiment.

Additional changes occurred in 1968 with the movement toward a brigade-based structure: the 389th Infantry Regiment became the 1st Brigade (BCT), the 390th Infantry Regiment became the 2d Brigade (BCT) and the 392nd Infantry Regiment became the 3rd Brigade (AIT-Engineer), the only Engineer Pioneer training unit in the Army Reserve at the time. The 3rd Battalion/392nd Infantry Regiment/3rd Brigade was based in Hillcrest, New York and performed Engineer AIT training of Soldiers at Fort Leonard Wood, Missouri during their annual two-week training periods throughout the Vietnam War. The changes of 1968 also ushered in the designation and training of Army Reserve Drill Sergeants, a significant and enduring innovation. Additional reorganization in 1994 redesignated the unit as the 98th Division (Institutional Training), a change in which the 98th retained its previous IET mission but also acquired the missions and force structure formerly associated with to the U.S. Army Reserve Forces schools. The 98th would maintain this basic organization and mission for the next 14 years.

=== Global war on Terror ===
On 3 September 2004, the 98th Division received mobilization orders for Operation Iraqi Freedom. This mobilization was to be the first overseas deployment for the unit since World War II. The mission, known as the Foreign Army Training Assistance Command (FA-TRAC), consisted primarily of training the new Iraqi Army and Iraqi security forces. An expeditionary force of more than 700 Iroquois warriors were trained and equipped at four sites: Camp Atterbury, Fort Bliss, Fort Hood and Fort Benning.

The demands of Operation Iraqi Freedom required an accelerated training schedule which crammed as many warfighting skills as possible into a forty-one-day period. This was the 98th's first substantial exposure to the asymmetric battlefield, requiring training in counterinsurgency techniques and preparing to face an opponent who did not fight along traditional fronts. The 98th made full use of the 33,000 acres at Camp Atterbury and marched everywhere. It was at Camp Atterbury that the advisory support teams (later renamed military training teams), the heart of the FA-TRAC mission, transformed to cohesive units in long days.

In fall 2004, the 98th Division arrived in Baghdad and filled the ranks of the Multinational Security Transition Command-Iraq (MNSTC-I), the unit charged with assisting the Iraqi government in developing, training and equipping the new Iraqi security forces. The unit used its pool of drill sergeant and instructor expertise to train Iraqi soldiers and officers to prescribed standards under the constant threat of insurgent attack and under austere conditions.

Instruction and support teams spread out across all points in Iraq from Al Kasik in the north to as far south as Umm Qasr. They established contact with Iraqi security units with the help of interpreters and helped build the six divisions of the new Iraqi Army. They also established officer and noncommissioned officer education schools at the Kirkush Military Training Base. They trained Iraqi police, the Highway Patrol, the special Police Commandos and the Iraqi Border Police.

The division also fielded soldiers to such other locations as Guantanamo Bay, Cuba, the Horn of Africa, Kuwait, Jordan and Afghanistan.

Five 98th Training Division soldiers were killed in action during the division's deployment to Iraq in 2004–05.

== Organization ==
The 98th Training Division is a subordinate unit of the 108th Training Command, which is tasked with providing Initial Entry Training (IET) to new recruits. The 98th Training Division provides Basic Combat Training (BCT), as well as One Station Unit Training (OSUT) for Infantry and Cavalry recruits. One Station Unit Training combines Basic Combat Training and Advanced Individual Training (AIT) at one location. Besides providing training at their main training locations the division's battalions also operate numerous training detachments. As of January 2026 the following units are subordinated to the 98th Training Division:

- 98th Training Division (IET), at Fort Benning (GA)
  - 1st Brigade (MT), at Fort Benning (GA)
    - 3rd Battalion, 330th Regiment (IN OSUT), at Livonia (MI)
      - Detachment 1 (Alpha Company), 3rd Battalion, 330th Regiment (IN OSUT), in Waterford (MI)
      - Detachment 2 (Bravo Company), 3rd Battalion, 330th Regiment (IN OSUT), in Kalamazoo (MI)
      - Detachment 3 (Charlie Company), 3rd Battalion, 330th Regiment (IN OSUT), in Bloomington (IN)
      - Detachment 6 (Foxtrot Company), 3rd Battalion, 330th Regiment (IN OSUT), in Grand Rapids (MI)
    - 2nd Battalion, 398th Regiment (CAV OSUT), in Madisonville (KY)
      - Detachment 1 (Alpha Troop), 2nd Battalion, 398th Regiment (CAV OSUT), in Hopkinsville (KY)
      - Detachment 4 (Delta Troop), 2nd Battalion, 398th Regiment (CAV OSUT), in Oak Ridge (TN)
    - 2nd Battalion, 415th Regiment (CAV OSUT), at Camp Parks (CA)
      - Detachment 1 (Alpha Troop), 2nd Battalion, 415th Regiment (CAV OSUT), in Fresno (CA)
      - Detachment 2 (Bravo Troop), 2nd Battalion, 415th Regiment (CAV OSUT), in Sacramento (CA)
      - Detachment 3 (Charlie Troop), 2nd Battalion, 415th Regiment (CAV OSUT), in Bell (CA)
    - 3rd Battalion, 485th Regiment (IN OSUT), at Fort Benning (GA)
      - Detachment 4 (Delta Company), 3rd Battalion, 485th Regiment (IN OSUT), in Concord (NC)
      - Detachment 5 (Echo Company), 3rd Battalion, 485th Regiment (IN OSUT), in McLeansville (NC)
      - Detachment 6 (Foxtrot Company), 3rd Battalion, 485th Regiment (IN OSUT), at Joint Base Charleston (SC)
    - 4th Battalion, 518th Regiment (TS), at Maxwell Air Force Base (AL)
  - 2nd Brigade (BCT), at Fort Jackson (SC)
    - 1st Battalion, 321st Regiment (BCT), at Fort Jackson (SC)
      - Detachment 2 (Bravo Company), 1st Battalion, 321st Regiment (BCT), in Raleigh (NC)
      - Detachment 3 (Charlie Company), 1st Battalion, 321st Regiment (BCT), in Winterville (NC)
      - Detachment 4 (Delta Company), 1st Battalion, 321st Regiment (BCT), at Fort Bragg (NC)
      - Detachment 5 (Echo Company), 1st Battalion, 321st Regiment (BCT), in Asheville (NC)
      - Detachment 6 (Foxtrot Company), 1st Battalion, 321st Regiment (BCT), in Lumberton (NC)
    - 3rd Battalion, 321st Regiment (TS), at Fort Jackson (SC)
    - 3rd Battalion, 323rd Regiment (BCT), in Athens (GA)
      - Detachment 1 (Alpha Company), 3rd Battalion, 323rd Regiment (BCT), at Fort Gillem (GA)
      - Detachment 3 (Charlie Company), 3rd Battalion, 323rd Regiment (BCT), in Rome (GA)
      - Detachment 4 (Delta Company), 3rd Battalion, 323rd Regiment (BCT), in Greenville (SC)
      - Detachment 5 (Echo Company), 3rd Battalion, 323rd Regiment (BCT), in Spartanburg (SC)
      - Detachment 6 (Foxtrot Company), 3rd Battalion, 323rd Regiment (BCT), in Florence (SC)
    - 4th Battalion, 323rd Regiment (BCT), in Montgomery (AL)
      - Detachment 1 (Alpha Company), 4th Battalion, 323rd Regiment (BCT), in Orlando (FL)
      - Detachment 2 (Bravo Company), 4th Battalion, 323rd Regiment (BCT), in Birmingham (AL)
      - Detachment 3 (Charlie Company), 4th Battalion, 323rd Regiment (BCT), in Mobile (AL)
      - Detachment 4 (Delta Company), 4th Battalion, 323rd Regiment (BCT), in Milton (FL)
      - Detachment 5 (Echo Company), 4th Battalion, 323rd Regiment (BCT), in Starkville (MS)
      - Detachment 6 (Foxtrot Company), 4th Battalion, 323rd Regiment (BCT), in Baton Rouge (LA)
    - 2nd Battalion, 485th Regiment (BCT), in Orlando (FL)
      - Detachment 2 (Bravo Company), 2nd Battalion, 485th Regiment (BCT), in Jacksonville (FL)
      - Detachment 3 (Charlie Company), 2nd Battalion, 485th Regiment (BCT), in Orlando (FL)
      - Detachment 4 (Delta Company), 2nd Battalion, 485th Regiment (BCT), in St. Petersburg (FL)
      - Detachment 5 (Echo Company), 2nd Battalion, 485th Regiment (BCT), in West Palm Beach (FL)
      - Detachment 7 (Golf Company), 2nd Battalion, 485th Regiment (BCT), in Fort Lauderdale (FL)
      - Detachment 8 (Hotel Company), 2nd Battalion, 485th Regiment (BCT), in Perrine (FL)
    - 3rd Battalion, 518th Regiment (BCT), in Hickory (NC)
      - Detachment 1 (Alpha Company), 3rd Battalion, 518th Regiment (BCT), in McLeansville (NC)
      - Detachment 3 (Charlie Company), 3rd Battalion, 518th Regiment (BCT), in Blackwood (NJ)
      - Detachment 4 (Delta Company), 3rd Battalion, 518th Regiment (BCT), in High Point (NC)
      - Detachment 6 (Foxtrot Company), 3rd Battalion, 518th Regiment (BCT), in Edison (NJ)
  - 3rd Brigade (BCT), in Amherst (NY)
    - 1st Battalion, 304th Regiment (BCT), in Londonderry (NH)
      - Detachment 2 (Bravo Company), 1st Battalion, 304th Regiment (BCT), in Schenectady (NY)
      - Detachment 4 (Delta Company), 1st Battalion, 304th Regiment (BCT), at Naval Station Newport (RI)
      - Detachment 5 (Echo Company), 1st Battalion, 304th Regiment (BCT), in Blackwood (NJ)
      - Detachment 6 (Foxtrot Company), 1st Battalion, 304th Regiment (BCT), at Fort Meade (MD)
    - 2nd Battalion, 389th Regiment (BCT), in Horseheads (NY)
    - 2nd Battalion, 417th Regiment (BCT), in Danbury (CT)
      - Detachment 1 (Alpha Company), 2nd Battalion, 417th Regiment (BCT), in Mattydale (NY)
      - Detachment 2 (Bravo Company), 2nd Battalion, 417th Regiment (BCT), in West Hartford (CT)
      - Detachment 3 (Charlie Company), 2nd Battalion, 417th Regiment (BCT), at Fort Devens (MA)
      - Detachment 4 (Delta Company), 2nd Battalion, 417th Regiment (BCT), in Lodi (NJ)
      - Detachment 6 (Foxtrot Company), 2nd Battalion, 417th Regiment (BCT), in Webster (NY)

Abbreviations: IET — Initial Entry Training; BCT — Basic Combat Training; MT — Maneuver Tactics; IN — Infantry; CAV — Cavalry; OSUT — One Station Unit Training; TS — Training Support

== General ==
Nickname: Iroquois.

Shoulder patch: The 98th Division Patch consists of a shield in the shape of the Great seal of the State of New York, with the head of an Iroquois Indian Chief. The five feathers represent the five original Iroquois nations: the Seneca, Onondaga, Oneida, Cayuga and Mohawk. The blue and orange-gold colors are those of the Dutch House of Nassau, the earliest settlers of New York State. On 8 September 2012, the Armed Forces Reserve Center at Fort Benning, Georgia, where the unit is located, was memorialized in honor of Chaplain (Lieutenant Colonel) Elmer W. Heindl who had served in the 98th.

== Commanding officers ==
- Brigadier General Charles E. Kilbourne (9 December 1928 – 11 October 1929)
- Brigadier General William Payne Jackson (18 November 1929 – 15 October 1931)
- Colonel Charles H. Morrow (15 October 1931 – 8 February 1932)
- Brigadier General Charles DuVal Roberts (8 February 1932 – 31 March 1936)
- Brigadier General Perry L. Miles (2 May 1936 – 8 January 1937)
- Brigadier General Walter C. Short (4 March 1937 – 15 June 1938)
- Colonel Thomas L. Crystal (15 June 1938 – 25 August 1938)
- Brigadier General Irving J. Phillipson (25 August 1938 – 1 March 1940)
- Major General Paul L. Ransom (September 1942 – November 1943)
- Major General George Wesley Griner Jr. (November 1943 – June 1944)
- Major General Ralph C. Smith (July 1944 – August 1944)
- Major General Arthur M. Harper (November 1944 – February 1946)
- Brigadier General Kenneth Townsend (1946–1949)
- Brigadier General Hugh Barclay (1950–1953)
- Major General John W. Morgan (1953–1957)
- Major General James C. Mott (1957–1960)
- Major General Cooper B. Rhodes (1960–1964)
- Major General Laddie L. Stahl (1964–1975)
- Major General Harry S. Parmelee (1975–1979)
- Major General Charles D. Barrett (1979–1982)
- Major General Norbert J. Rappl (1982–1987)
- Brigadier General Dean L. Linscott (1987–1987)
- Major General Barclay O. Wellman (1987–1992)
- Major General Thomas W. Sabo (1992–1996)
- Major General Peter A. Gannon (1996–2000)
- Major General Charles E. Wilson (2000–2002)
- Major General Bruce Robinson (2002–07)
- Brigadier General Robert Catalanotti (2007–08)
- Colonel David J. Conboy (2009–2009)
- Brigadier General Robert P. Stall (2009–2010)
- Brigadier General Dwayne R. Edwards (2010–12)
- Brigadier General Michaelene A. Kloster (2012–2015)
- Brigadier General Tammy S. Smith (2015–2016)
- Brigadier General Miles A. Davis (2016–2019)
- Major General Tony L. Wright (2019–2021)
- Colonel Donald L. Ellison (Acting) (2021–2022)
- Brigadier General David M. Samuelsen (2022–2024) https://www.gomo.army.mil/rc/ext/portal/officer/resumes.aspx?ltr=s&type=active
- Brigadier General Gregory G. Glasow (2024–present) https://www.gomo.army.mil/rc/ext/portal/officer/resumes.aspx?ltr=s&type=active

Unit honors:

  CAMPAIGN PARTICIPATION CREDIT
World War II
Asiatic-Pacific Theater, Streamer without inscription
DECORATIONS
Army Superior Unit Award, Streamer embroidered 2004–2005
