= Operation Titanic =

WWII military deception operation

- Part of Operation Bodyguard
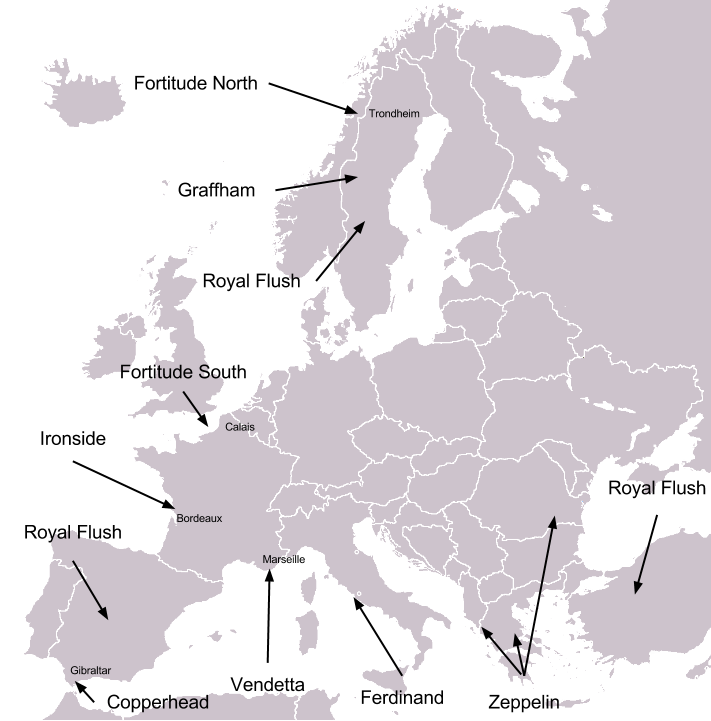
- The D-Day naval deceptions made up one part of Operation Bodyguard.
- Operational scope: Tactical Deception
- Location: English Channel
- Planned: 1944
- Planned by: London Controlling Section, Ops (B), Allied Expeditionary Air Force
- Target: Nazi Germany
- Date: 5–6 June 1944
- Executed by: United Kingdom: No. 138 Squadron RAF; No. 161 Squadron RAF; No. 90 Squadron RAF; No. 149 Squadron RAF; Special Air Service
- Outcome: Allied success
- Casualties: 2 Short Stirling of No. 149 Squadron and their crews 8 Men Special Air Service killed or executed

Operation Titanic was a series of military deceptions carried out by the Allied Nations during the Second World War. They formed part of tactical element of Operation Bodyguard, the cover plan for the Normandy landings. Titanic was carried out on 5–6 June 1944 (the night of the invasion) by the Royal Air Force and the Special Air Service. Its objective was to drop hundreds of dummy parachutists, noisemakers and small numbers of special forces troops in locations away from the real Normandy drop zones. It hoped to deceive the German defenders into believing that a large force had landed, drawing troops away from the beachheads and other strategic sites.

Titanic was undertaken by four squadrons from No. 3 Group RAF (the special duties squadrons) alongside detachments from the 2nd SAS Regiment. It accompanied other tactical deceptions including Operations Glimmer and Taxable and wide ranging radar deception. Overall the results of Titanic were broadly achieved. Intercepts of German communications indicate that at least some of the landings were believed to be real and they sowed some confusion during the early part of the Normandy invasion.

== Background ==
Operation Titanic formed part of Operation Bodyguard, a broad strategic military deception intended to confuse the Axis high command as to Allied intentions during the lead-up to the Normandy landings. The most complex portion of Bodyguard involved a wide-ranging strategic deception, organised by the London Controlling Section (LCS), in southern England called Fortitude South. Through decoy hardware, radio transmissions and double agents, Operation Fortitude South attempted to inflate the size of the Allied force in England and develop a threat against the Pas-de-Calais (rather than Normandy, the real target of Operation Overlord).

As D-Day approached, Allied planners moved on to tactical deceptions (roughly under the umbrella of Fortitude) to help cover the progress of the real invasion forces. The D-Day naval deceptions (Taxable and Glimmer) were planned for the eve of the Normandy landings to develop threats against the Pas-de-Calais region. Titanic was intended as an accompaniment to these deceptions, as well as to create general confusion for the defending forces on the morning of D-Day. The idea originated from a plan submitted by David Strangeways (head of the tactical deception unit of 21st Army Group) which in turn was a rewrite of a plan from the Supreme HQ Allied Expeditionary Force (SHAEF) Ops (B).

The operation made use of several physical and audio deception techniques developed through the early part of the war. The main physical deception were parachute dummies codenamed Paragons or Saints. These were essentially stuffed hessian (burlap) sacks in the shape of a human with a simple parachute. These were effective in the air in low or no light, but on the ground would be easy to determine as a feint. Douglas Fairbanks Jr. introduced the idea of dummies that self-destructed to try and keep the deception going longer. Peter Fleming, brother to Bond author Ian Fleming, who ran deception operations in Asia, added the innovation of "Pintails". These were designed to land upright on the ground and fire off flares to simulate the actions of commanding officers. In addition to the dummies, Titanic relied on various sonic deceptions to persist the deception on the ground. The Allies had developed several systems for electronic noise generation including the British "Poplin" and American "Heater". These technologies, which used either audio recorded onto film reel or magnetic wire, had been used first during the North Africa campaign. For Titanic recordings of troops and weaponry were attached to the dummies along with an American loudspeaker system nicknamed "Bunsen Burner". Alongside these more advanced technologies the deceivers also made use of simpler physical audio generation. Strips of fire crackers and noise bombs were included to simulate realistic gunfire. Altogether this could create the effect of troops engaged in a firefight for up to six hours, with each plane able to drop material sufficient to simulate a platoon-sized group.

== Operation ==
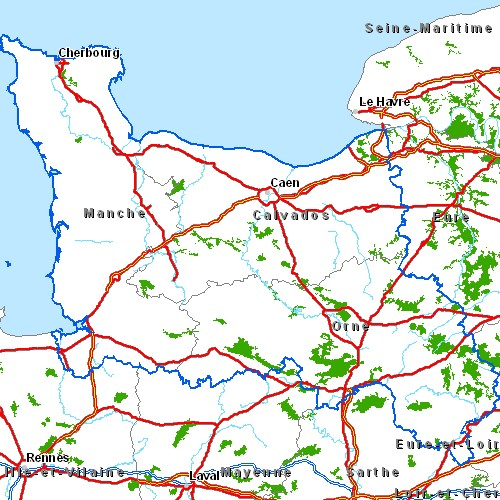
Map of the Operation Titanic area Seine-Maritime in the east, Manche in the west and Caen in the centre

Titanic was divided into four operations (I to IV), consisting of various combinations of dummy paratroopers, noisemakers, chaff (codenamed Window) and SAS personnel. The noisemakers, codenamed Pintails, were attached to each dummy to simulate rifle fire. They also carried a small explosive timed to destroy the dummy and give the appearance of a paratrooper burning his parachute. Four squadrons from No. 3 Group RAF (the special duties squadrons) carried out the drops. No. 138 and No. 161, flying Handley Page Halifaxes and Lockheed Hudsons, as well as No. 90 and No. 149, flying Short Stirlings.

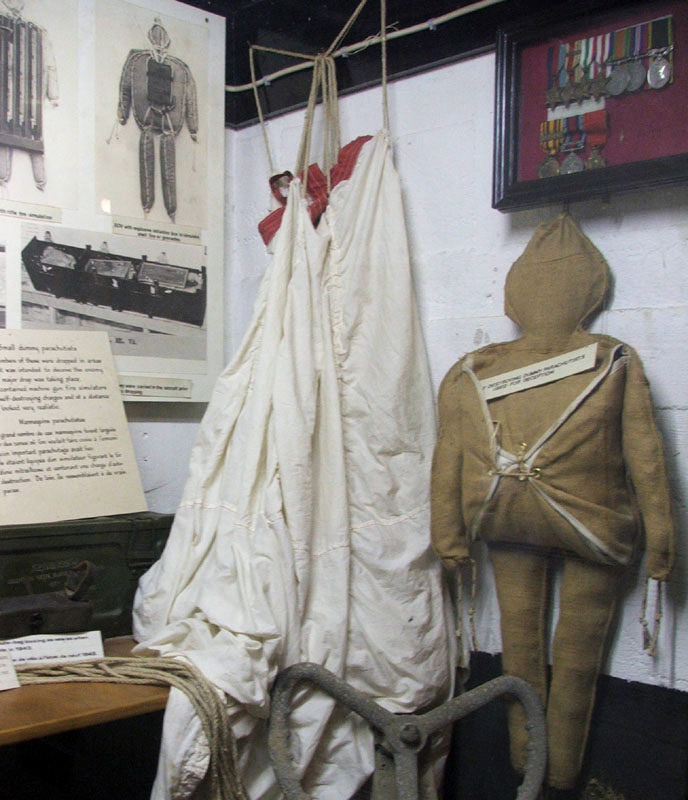
British parachute dummy now on display at the Merville Gun Battery museum in France

M. R. D. Foot, intelligence officer for the SAS brigade, was ordered to arrange the special forces contingent. He first approached the head of 1st SAS Regiment, Lieutenant Colonel Paddy Mayne, who refused to take part in an intelligence operation, having had a bad experience implementing deception plans while in North Africa. However, Lieutenant Colonel Brian Franks of the 2nd SAS Regiment was convinced to take part in the operation. 2nd SAS provided twelve men under the command of Captain Frederick James Fowles (Chick) and Lieutenant Norman Harry Poole. After landing these teams were to locate and open fire on the German forces, allowing some to escape in the hope they would report the parachute drops. To deceive the Germans into thinking there was a large parachute landing in progress, the SAS teams played 30 minute pre-recorded sounds of men shouting and weapons fire including mortars.

In total, around four hundred dummies were planned to be dropped as part of the operation. Titanic I simulated the drop of an airborne division north of the Seine river near Yvetot, Yerville, Doudeville in the Seine-Maritime region and Fauville in the Eure region. These targets corresponded with the fake landing simulated as part of Operation Taxable naval deception. In total, two hundred dummies and two SAS teams were parachuted in across these four targets. Titanic II would have involved dropping fifty dummies east of the Dives River to draw German reserves onto that side of the river and away from the actual D-Day landings. However, this segment of the operation was cancelled just before 6 June on the basis of there being too much air traffic to fit it in. A further fifty dummies were dropped, as Titanic III, in the Calvados region near Maltot and the woods to the north of Baron-sur-Odon to draw German reserves away to the west of Caen. Finally, Titanic IV involved two hundred dummies dropped near Marigny in the Manche, as with Titanic I the intention was to simulate the dropping of an airborne division. Two SAS teams were also dropped near Saint-Lô. This group commanded by Captain Fowles and Lieutenant Poole landed at 00:20 on 6 June 1944, 10 minutes ahead of schedule.

The mission went according to plan. The only aircraft lost were two Short Stirlings and their crews from No. 149 Squadron taking part in Titanic III. Eight men from the SAS failed to return; they were all either killed in action or executed by the Germans in Bergen-Belsen concentration camp.

== Impact ==
It seems that most of the aims of Titanic were achieved. At 02:00 on 6 June 1944, German units reported the landing of parachutists east of Caen and in the Coutances, Valognes and Saint-Lô areas and hearing ships' engines out at sea. In response commanders ordered the 7th Army to increase the level of their preparedness and to expect an invasion, but General Hans Speidel decreased the level of alert when it was reported only dummy parachutists had been found. However, Generalfeldmarshall Gerd von Rundstedt ordered the 12th SS Panzerdivision Hitlerjugend to deal with a supposed parachute landing on the coast near Lisieux which was found to consist solely of dummies from Titanic III. The dummies and SAS teams of Titanic IV diverted a Kampfgruppe from the 915th Grenadier Regiment, the 352nd Infantry Division reserve away from the Omaha and Gold beaches and the 101st Airborne Divisions drop zones. The regiment, believing an airborne division had landed, were employed searching woods instead of heading to the invasion beaches. Enigma intercepts from the area of Titanic I revealed that the German commander was reporting a major landing up the coast from Le Havre (well to the north of the landing beaches) and that he had been cut off by them. The combination of Taxable and Titanic I appears to have been interpreted as intended by the German command with communications indicating they felt it had been defeated and turned back.
