= Noel Wild =

British Army officer (b.1903)

Harry Noel Havelock Wild
- Born: 10 November 1903
- Died: 1995 (aged 91–92)
- Military career
- Branch: British Army
- Service years: 1924–1950
- Rank: Colonel
- Conflicts: Second World War
- Awards: Officer of the Order of the British Empire, 1943 Order of Orange-Nassau (Netherlands), 1945

Colonel Harry Noel Havelock Wild OBE (born 10 November 1903; usually referred to as Noel Wild) was a British Army officer during the Second World War. He is notable for being second in command of the deception organisation 'A' Force as well as head of Ops. B (the department responsible for part of the Operation Bodyguard planning). He was educated at Eton College.

Wild joined the Territorial Army in 1924 and obtained a transfer, via the influence of his uncle at the War Office, to the 11th Hussars the following year. He served with the 11th in England and Egypt (from 1933) before being posted home - first for training and then to teach at Bovington camp.

Wild spent some time trying to return to his regiment, but was unsuccessful. Upon his eventual return to Egypt (where the 11th Hussars were still based) he was posted as a staff officer at GHQ Middle East Command. Whilst in Cairo, disheartened by his situation, Wild ran into Dudley Clarke, an old friend. Clarke was head of 'A' Force, the department in charge of deception for the entire region. After renewing their acquaintance Clarke, in April 1942, asked Wild to join him at 'A' Force as his deputy and head of the "Operations" section.

Wild spent around eighteen months at 'A' Force, and was appointed an OBE for his work, before Clarke volunteered him to head a similar department in England. Ops (B) was a section of Supreme Headquarters Allied Expeditionary Force charged with deception along the Western Front. Wild accepted the position in December 1943 and was briefed on Operation Bodyguard, the cover plan for the impending Allied invasion of Europe. Theoretically Wild held a lot of power in this new role, but a combination of his own limitations and clashes with David Strangeways (head of 'R' Force and also widely influential) made his contribution smaller than it could have been.

Following the end of the Second World War, deception was scaled back. However, Wild remained involved in secret work until the 1970s (he retired from the Army in 1950). In 1971 he became embroiled in a plagiarism dispute between Roger Fleetwood-Hesketh and Sefton Delmer, Wild appears to have provided the former's report on Operation Bodyguard to Delmer whilst the latter was writing a book about deception during the war. Wild died in 1995.

== Early career ==
Wild joined the army in 1924. His uncle, Herbert Uniacke, helped him avoid the usual entrance exam. Wild joined the Territorial Army Royal East Kent Regiment as a second lieutenant, before being transferred to the 11th Hussars (via the influence of his uncle at the War Office). In 1933 the 11th was posted to Egypt, where Wild was appointed Technical Adjutant. After a tour of duty across Western Africa and Palestine he was sent back to England for a course at the Royal Military Academy. Before he could return to his unit, Wild was sent posted to Bovington Camp as one of the first instructors on a new cavalry wing.

Wild was disappointed by this turn of events, wishing to serve active duty with the 11th Hussars. He spent some time trying to return to his regiment, taking courses and eventually transferring to the Staff College at Camberley. All this was to no avail; upon finally arriving in Egypt in August 1941 the Hussars had a new commanding officer who was not interested in Wild's return. Instead he was posted to GHQ Middle East Command as a staff officer to Major General Richard McCreery. This was a huge disappointment to Wild: writing in 1980, David Mure notes that Wild considered all of his later Army career "a poor second to service with the 11th Hussars".

== 'A' Force ==
Despite his disappointment in his new role, Wild was pleased to find Dudley Clarke was in Cairo. The pair had become acquainted in Morocco and Palestine during the 1930s. They shared a love of the cinema, and would meet for dinner before going on to see a film or two. Wild was unsure of Clarke's secretive role at Middle East Command, but in April Clarke offered Wild a promotion and the chance to work for him. Despite being told nothing of the role Wild accepted and in May joined 'A' Force, the department charged with planning military deception in the region, as head of the Operations section and Clarke's deputy.

In late 1942, Clarke departed for England to discuss cover plans for Operation Torch. Wild was left in charge of 'A' Force in his stead and oversaw Operation Treatment, part of the cover for the Second Battle of El Alamein. Treatment's "story" was that a planned assault by Allied forces would be on 6 November, two weeks later than the real date, and complemented various physical deceptions (used to mask troop movements).

On 14 October 1943 Wild was appointed Officer of the Order of the British Empire (OBE). The citation, written by Clarke, made reference the Wild's work at 'A' Force - in particular during late 1942 and his work in south and east Africa in 1942–43.

== Ops (B) and Plan Bodyguard ==
Ops (B) was a special department of the Supreme Headquarters Allied Expeditionary Force (SHAEF) dedicated to deception planning (the "normal" operation planning department was called Ops (A)). It was set up in early 1943 to help organise Operation Bodyguard, the deception plan intended to cover the Allied invasion of Normandy in 1944. By November it was realised that an experienced leader was required to head the section, and Clarke secretly volunteered Wild.

Wild thought he had been given some leave when, on 17 December, he was sent home to England. However, it was merely an opportunity to be assessed by senior members of SHAEF. Shortly after Christmas, Wild was appointed the new head of Ops (B) and promoted to full colonel.

John Bevan, head of the London Controlling Section, briefed Wild on the Bodyguard deception and introduced him to the Twenty Committee. Bodyguard was a broad strategic deception intended to lead the Germans into thinking that the Allied invasion target was Calais. One of the plan's main avenues of disinformation were double agents, controlled by the Twenty Committee. Wild joined the committee and was tasked with coordinating all of the information disseminated by the agents.

Wild organised Ops (B) along the lines of 'A' Force (two sections, covering intelligence and operations) and began planning Operation Fortitude, the key segment of the Bodyguard Plan. By January a formal structure for deception planning had been established; Ops (B) would be responsible for planning within the SHAEF umbrella and direct the information to be sent by double agent channels while the London Controlling Section would have overall strategic control of deception. In practice, Wild, Bevan and the other planners communicated informally - a situation that worked well but left very little written record.

Although the position had a lot of authority, Wild struggled to make an impact, partly due to being "useless" (as a colleague put it) but also because of clashes with Colonel David Strangeways. Strangeways was another 'A' Force graduate, and former commander of the 21st Army Group. For Bodyguard he was commanding R Force, and did not approve of the plan or of Wild and took every opportunity to criticize both. In the end he succeeded in removing a lot of the operational control from Ops (B). Wild was left in charge of the "special means"; double agents and propaganda.

However, in the aftermath of D-Day, Wild regained control of deception planning, particularly the use of double agents, for the campaign in France. He responded by dispatching a contingent of his staff across the Channel. During this time Wild's relationship with the armed forces was tense. He refused to use any agent captured on the continent for deception, and often failed to communicate the content of deceptive messages to the affected units. Wild also took steps to limit Strangeways (and other deceptive units), often refusing the use of fictional units.

== Post-War ==
Following the end of the Second World War, deception planning was scaled back. The London Controlling Section became a three-man committee with little of its wartime power. By 1947 Wild was one of the remaining members, representing the security services and the army.

Wild retired from the army on 12 June 1950, although he continued to be involved in deception work into the next decade. In 1971, Wild became involved in a plagiarism dispute centred on Sefton Delmer's book The Counterfeit Spy, an account of Operation Fortitude. Much of the material was taken from a government report by Roger Fleetwood-Hesketh; it appeared that Wild had passed Hesketh's work on to Delmer. After a threat to sue (in which the government intervened to point out Hesketh's work was under Crown Copyright), Delmer published a second edition which credited Hesketh.

In 1980, Wild wrote an introduction to David Mure's Master of Deception. He died in 1995.

According to his obituary, Wild was "a useful cricketer, golfer and horseman ... patriotic and devoted to reforming what he described as the malaise affecting British society in the 1970s. He held that this stemmed from a lack of leadership in the Church and an anarchist attitude in the media. He was particularly concerned about the slanted versions of the news he thought that the BBC broadcast."

== Personality ==
Wild was not well liked by many within the services. He was considered "humourless and arrogant". He appears to have been anti-American. Jack Corbett, who met him in 1947 during a trip to London to examine British deception in the postwar era, found Wild to be a reluctant collaborator. Although Corbett opined that Wild was "cordial and socially friendly", he described him as "a slippery customer".

Wild's decree that no agents captured in Europe could be used for deception caused considerable resentment amongst the Allied establishment. The Americans, in particular, perceived it as a slight and indication that Wild did not trust men on the ground. This, and other restrictions on agent use, caused friction between Wild and the armed forces.
