= Force multiplication =

Factor that gives military assets the ability to accomplish greater feats than without it

In military science, force multiplication or a force multiplier is a factor or a combination of factors that gives personnel or weapons (or other hardware) the ability to accomplish greater feats than without it. The expected size increase required to have the same effectiveness without that advantage is the multiplication factor. For example, if a technology like GPS enables a force to accomplish the same results as a force five times as large without GPS, then the multiplier is five. Such estimates are used to justify the investment in force multipliers.

== History ==
Notable historical examples of force multiplication include:

- Fortifications: e.g. the Theodosian Wall of Constantinople
- Reliance on air force by the Coalition in the Gulf War and the 2003 invasion of Iraq

== Doctrinal changes ==
During the First World War, the Germans experimented with what were called "storm tactics" in which a small group of highly trained soldiers (stormtroopers) would open a salient through which much larger forces could penetrate. That met with only limited success by breaking through the first lines of defence but lacking the staying power to break the opposing forces entirely. The 1939 blitzkrieg, which broke through with coordinated mechanized ground forces with aircraft in close support, was vastly more effective.

Towards the end of the Second World War, the German Army introduced Kampfgruppe combat formations, which were composed of whatever units happened to be available. Though poor quality ones generally constituted the major part of them, they often performed successfully because of their high degree of flexibility and adaptability. Mission-type tactics, as opposed to extremely specific directives, which give no discretion to the junior commander, are now widely used by modern militaries because of their force multiplication. Originating from German concepts of Auftragstaktik, those tactics may be developing even more rapidly in the concept of network-centric warfare (NCW) in which subordinate commanders receive information not only from their own commanders but also from adjacent units.

A different paradigm was one of the results of the theories of John Boyd, the "high-low mix" in which a large number of less expensive aircraft, coupled with a small number of extremely capable "silver bullet" aircraft, had the effect of a much larger force. Boyd's concept of quick action is based on the repeated application of the "Boyd loop", consisting of the steps

- Observe: make use of the best sensors and other intelligence available
- Orient: put the new observations into a context with the old
- Decide: select the next action based on the combined observation and local knowledge
- Act: carry out the selected action, ideally while the opponent is still observing your last action.

Boyd's concept is also known as the OODA Loop and is a description of the decision-making process that Boyd contended applies to business, sports, law enforcement and military operations. Boyd's doctrine is widely taught in the American military, and one of the aims of network centric warfare is to "get inside his OODA loop." In other words, one should go from observation to action before the enemy can get past orientation, preventing him from ever being able to make an effective decision or put it into action. Small unit leadership is critical to this, and NCW's ability to disseminate information to small unit leaders enables such tactics.

Network-centric warfare can provide additional information and can help prevent friendly fire but also allows "swarm tactics" and the seizing of opportunities by subordinate forces. (Edwards 2000, p. 2) defines "a swarming case is any historical example in which the scheme of maneuver involves the convergent attack of five (or more) semiautonomous (or autonomous) units on a targeted force in some particular place. "Convergent" implies an attack from most of the points on the compass."

Another version of "swarming" is evident in air-to-ground attack formations in which the attack aircraft do not approach from one direction, at one time, or at the same altitude, but schedule the attacks so each one requires a Boyd-style OODA iteration to deal with a new threat. Replacement training units (RTU) were "finishing schools" for pilots that needed to know not just the school solution, but the actual tactics being used in Vietnam. Referring to close air support, "In the RTU, new pilots learned the rules of the road for working with a forward air controller (FAC). The hardest part was finding the small aircraft as it circled over the target area. The fast-moving fighters used directional finding/steering equipment to get close enough to the slow, low FAC until someone in the flight could get an eyeball on him—a tally-ho. Once the FAC was in sight, he would give the fighters a target briefing—type of target, elevation, attack heading, location of friendlies, enemy defensive fire, best egress heading if hit by enemy fire, and other pertinent data. Usually the fighters would set up a circle, called a wheel or "wagon wheel", over the FAC, and wait for him to mark the target. Once the target was marked, the flight leader would attack first.

== Psychology ==
Napoleon is well known for his comment "The moral is to the physical as three to one." Former United States Secretary of State and Chairman of the Joint Chiefs of Staff Colin Powell has said: "Perpetual optimism is a force multiplier." Morale, training, and ethos have long been known to result in disproportionate effects on the battlefield.

Psychological warfare can target the morale, politics, and values of enemy soldiers and their supporters to effectively neutralize them in a conflict.

Protecting local cultural heritage sites and investing in the relationships between local civilians and military forces can be seen as force multipliers leading to benefits in meeting or sustaining military objectives.

== Technology ==
Ranged weapons that hit their target are more effective than those that miss. That is why rifled muskets for infantry and rangefinders for artillery became commonplace in the 19th century.

Two new weapons of World War I, barbed wire and the machine gun, multiplied defensive forces, leading to the stalemate of trench warfare.

=== Aircraft carriers ===
Aircraft carriers, such as the USS Gerald R. Ford, can carry more than 75 aircraft with fuel and ammunition for all tasks that an aircraft carrier should need like air to air, air to naval and air to ground missions. When deployed, aircraft carriers are a massive force multiplier that can turn any engagement in favour of those that have the aircraft carrier. Carriers can hold different type of aircraft to different usage meaning the force multiplier can vary depending on the specific task at hand.

=== Tankers ===
Airborne tanker aircraft, such as the Boeing KC-135 are a very significant force multiplier. They can carry fuel so bomber and fighter aircraft can take off loaded with extra weapons instead of full fuel tanks. The tankers also increase the range and time loitering within or near the target areas by off-loading fuel when it is needed. Tankers can also be used to rapidly deploy fighters, bombers, SIGNET, Airborne Command Post, and cargo aircraft from the United States to the areas where they are needed. The force multiplier of a KC-135R can be anywhere from 1.5 to as much as 6 when used near the target area.

=== Bombers ===
At one extreme, a stealth aircraft like the Northrop Grumman B-2 Spirit strategic bomber can attack a target without needing the large numbers of escort fighter aircraft, electronic-warfare aircraft, Suppression of Enemy Air Defenses, and other supporting aircraft that would be needed were conventional bombers used against the same target.

Precision-guided munitions (PGM) give an immense multiplication. The Thanh Hóa Bridge in North Vietnam had been only mildly damaged by approximately 800 sorties by aircraft armed with conventional unguided bombs, but had one of its spans destroyed by a 12-plane mission, of which 8 carried laser-guided bombs. Two small subsequent missions, again with laser-guided bombs, completed the destruction of this target. Precision-guided munitions are one example of what has been called the Revolution in Military Affairs. In World War II, British night bombers could hit, at best, an area of a city.

Modern PGMs commonly put a bomb within 3–10 meters of its target (see circular error probable), and most carry an explosive charge significant enough that this uncertainty is effectively voided. See the use of heavy bombers in direct support of friendly troops in Afghanistan, using the technique of Ground-Aided Precision Strike.

=== Fighter combat ===
Fighter aircraft coordinated by an AWACS control aircraft, so that they can approach targets without being revealed by their own radar, and who are assigned to take specific targets so that duplication is avoided, are far more effective than an equivalent number of fighters dependent on their own resources for target acquisition.

In exercises between the Indian and US air forces, the Indian pilots had an opportunity to operate with AWACS control, and found it extremely effective. India then ordered AWACS aircraft, using Israeli Phalcon electronics on a Russian airframe, and this exercise is part of their preparation. Officer and pilot comments included "definitely was a force multiplier. Giving you an eye deep beyond you". "We could pick up incoming targets whether aircraft or missiles almost 400 kilometers away. It gives a grand battle coordination in the air".

== Creating local forces ==
The use of small numbers of specialists to create larger effective forces is another form of multiplication. A US Army Special Forces Operational Detachment Alpha ("A Team") is a 12-man unit that can train and lead a company-sized unit (100–200 men) of local guerrillas.

== Deception ==
Deception can produce the potential effect of a much larger force. The fictitious First United States Army Group (FUSAG) was portrayed to the World War II Germans as the main force for the invasion of Europe. Operation Bodyguard successfully gave the impression that FUSAG was to land at the Pas de Calais, convincing the Germans that the real attack at Normandy was a feint. As a result of the successful deception, the Normandy force penetrated deeply, in part, because the Germans held back strategic reserves that they thought would be needed at the Pas de Calais, against what was a nonexistent force. FUSAG's existence was suggested by the use of decoy vehicles that the Allies allowed to be photographed, fictitious radio traffic generated by a small number of specialists, and the Double-Cross System. Double Cross referred to turning all surviving German spies in the UK into double agents, who sent back convincing reports that were consistent with the deception programs being conducted by the London Controlling Section.

== See also ==
- Asymmetric warfare
- C4ISTAR
- Lanchester's laws
- List of established military terms
- Network-centric warfare
