= Operation Fortitude =

WWII deception operation

- Part of Operation Bodyguard
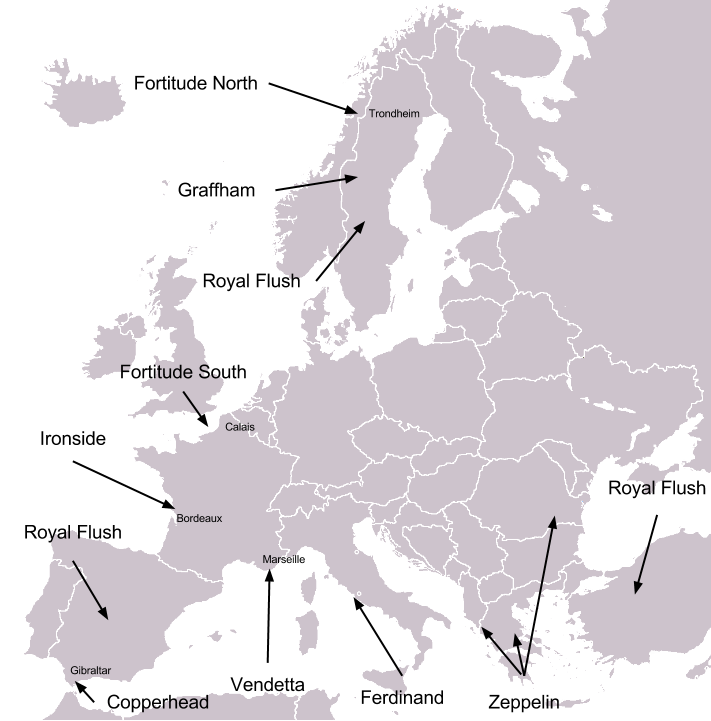
- Fortitude North and South constituted the main portion of the overall Bodyguard deception
- Operational scope: Military deception
- Location: United Kingdom
- Planned: December 1943 – March 1944
- Planned by: London Controlling Section, Ops (B), R Force
- Target: Axis powers
- Date: March–June 1944

Operation Fortitude was a military deception operation by the Allied nations as part of Operation Bodyguard, an overall deception strategy during the buildup to the 1944 Normandy landings. Fortitude was divided into two subplans, North and South, and had the aim of misleading the German High Command as to the location of the invasion.

Fortitude had evolved from plans submitted by Noel Wild, the head of Ops (B), and John Bevan, from the London Controlling Section in late 1943. Early revisions in January 1944 suggested a fictional buildup of troops in southern England with the hope of drawing German attention to Pas-de-Calais. Colonel David Strangeways, head of Bernard Montgomery's R Force deception staff, was unimpressed with the approach. He was widely critical of the original plan and eventually rewrote the Fortitude deception with a focus on creating a more realistic threat.

Both Fortitude plans involved the creation of phantom field armies (based in Edinburgh and southern England), which threatened Norway (Fortitude North) and Pas de Calais (Fortitude South). The operation was intended to divert Axis attention away from Normandy and, after the invasion on 6 June 1944, to delay reinforcement by convincing the Germans that the landings had been purely a diversionary attack.

== Background ==
Fortitude was one of the major elements of Operation Bodyguard, the overall Allied deception stratagem for the Normandy landings. Bodyguard's main objectives were to ensure that the Germans would not increase troop presence in Normandy and to do so by promoting the appearance that the Allies would attack in other locations. It consisted of a wide range of deceptions ranging across the European front, with Operation Fortitude representing the main effort to misdirect the Oberkommando der Wehrmacht (German High Command) to believe in specific mainland invasion objectives.

The problem facing the Allies was that France was the most logical choice for an invasion into German-occupied Europe. Therefore, the Allied high command had only a small geographical area across which to mislead the German defences. Montgomery, commanding the Allied landing forces, knew that the crucial aspect of any invasion was the ability to enlarge a beachhead into a full front. He also had only 37 divisions at his command, compared to around 60 German Army formations. That meant that any deception would have to convince the German high command that the Allies were not committing their full forces into Normandy, but holding many of those formations in reserve. After the landings, there would then need to be some way to delay the movement of German reserves to the Normandy beachhead to prevent a potentially disastrous counterattack.

Operation Fortitude focused on creating invasion threats from the United Kingdom into various parts of Western Europe. The plan was eventually split into two parts, North and South. Fortitude South focused on creating confusion about the Allied Channel crossing, and Fortitude North, staged out of Scotland, introduced a threat to occupied Norway. Planning for Bodyguard overall came under the auspices of the London Controlling Section (LCS), a secret body that was set up to manage Allied deception strategy during the war. However, the execution of individual plans fell to the various theatre commanders. In the case of Fortitude, it was Supreme Headquarters Allied Expeditionary Force (SHAEF), under General Dwight D. Eisenhower and specifically 21st Army Group, the invasion force, under the command of General Bernard Montgomery. A special section, Ops (B), was established at SHAEF to handle Fortitude, and Montgomery formed R Force under his command to handle the tactical elements of deception. (Note: The London Controlling Section retained central responsibility for the use of diplomatic channels and double agents.)

=== Deception techniques ===
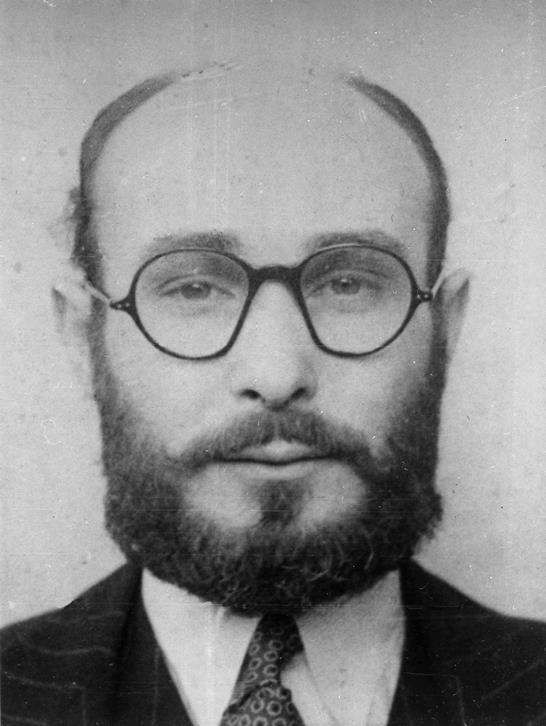
Juan Pujol Garcia, or agent Garbo, was a key part of the Fortitude deception

The idea of creating fake formations as a method of deception had been pioneered in Cairo by Dudley Clarke's 'A' Force earlier in the war. Fortitude made heavy use of Clarke's techniques for inflating the size of an army and used a number of methodologies which had come to be referred to as "special means." They included combinations of physical deception, fake wireless (radio) activity, leaks through diplomatic channels or double agents and the usage of notable officers in fake formations.

One of the main deception channels for the Allies was the use of double agents. B1A, the Counter-Intelligence Division of MI5, had done a good job in intercepting numerous German agents in Britain. Many of them were recruited as double agents under the Double Cross System. For Fortitude, the intelligence agencies made particular use of three agents:

- Juan Pujol García (Garbo), a Spanish citizen who volunteered to set himself up as a double agent. Garbo was a key agent for the Fortitude deception. His fictional network of 27 agents across Britain was an excellent way to create the impression of additional formations. He was so trusted he was awarded the Iron Cross (for his efforts on D-Day, he was awarded an MBE).
- Roman Czerniawski (Brutus), a Polish officer who ran an intelligence network for the Allies in occupied France. Captured by the Germans, he was offered a chance to work for them as a spy. On his arrival in Britain, he turned himself in to British intelligence.
- Dušan Popov (Tricycle), a Yugoslav lawyer, whose flamboyant lifestyle covered his intelligence activities.

== Planning ==
Detailed planning ostensibly sat with Noel Wild and his Ops (B) staff. In practice, it was a collaboration between Wild and the heads of the London Controlling Section and B1a. Work began in December 1943 under the codename Mespot. Wild's first version of the Fortitude plan was socialised in early January 1943 with SHAEF, political leaders and the staff officers of the 21st Army Group. That iteration aimed to take advantage of the likelihood that the Germans would notice invasion preparations in southern England. Wild wanted to create the impression that an invasion was aimed at the Pas-de-Calais slightly later in the year (July, instead of June). Once the real invasion had landed, six fictional divisions would then keep the threat to Calais alive.

Colonel David Strangeways, head of Montgomery's R Force, raised concerns about the entire plan. Strangeways argued that the plan aimed to cover the Allies' real intentions, instead of creating a realistic threat to Calais to which Axis forces would be forced to respond in defence. He was concerned the Germans might well be aware of the Allied readiness in southern England and so they would be alert to the risk of an invasion in early June. However, they would realise this gave them several weeks to defeat any bridgehead and return to defend Calais. On 25 January, Montgomery's Chief of Staff, Francis de Guingand, sent a letter to the deception planners that asked them to focus on Pas-de-Calais as the main assault and was almost certainly sent at the behest of Strangeways.

With those criticisms in hand, Wild produced his final draft for Fortitude. In the revised plan, which was issued on 30 January and approved by the Allied chiefs on 18 February, fifty divisions would be positioned in Southern England to attack Pas de Calais. After the real invasion had landed, the story would change to suggest to the Germans that several assault divisions remained in England that were ready to conduct a cross-Channel attack once the Normandy beachhead had drawn German defences away from Calais. The plan still retained some of its initial form, most notably since the first part of the story still aimed to suggest an invasion date of mid-July. At that point, Winston Churchill judged 'Mespot' to be an unsuitable name and so 'Fortitude' was adopted from an alternative list on 18 February. (Note: SHAEF was offered a list of names to choose from; Bulldog, Axehead, Swordhilt, Fortitude and Ignite)

=== Strangeways rewrite ===
I rewrote it entirely. It was too complicated, and the people who made it had not never done it before. Now they did their best – but it didn't suit the operation that Monty was considering.... You see so much depended on the success of that deception plan.

— Strangeways, writing in 1996

Strangeways was still unimpressed with the Fortitude outline, and, according to Ops (B)'s Christopher Harmer, in mid-February, he set out to ride "roughshod over the established deception organization". Harmer writes that Strangeways displayed the same arrogance as his commanding officer. Montgomery was famously opinionated and held a low opinion of the London establishment of the "old boys'" of Ops (B) and the LCS. More importantly, however, he had worked under Dudley Clarke in Cairo during the beginning of the war and had extensive experience of deception operations.

In the North African campaign, he had learned Clarke's maxim that deception relied on getting the enemy to do something, not just to think something, and so his criticism focused on that. He pointed out that convincing the Germans of so many fictional divisions would be difficult, and even more so would be convincing them of Montgomery's ability to manage two entire invasions at the same time. Wild's plan outlined ten divisions for the Calais assault, six of them being fictional and the remainder being the real American V Corps and British I Corps. However, the corps would be part of the actual Normandy invasion and so it would be difficult to imply Calais as the main assault after D-Day. Strangeways's final concerns related to the effort required for physical deception, as the plan called for large numbers of troop movements and dummy craft.

Symbol of the fictional 1st US Army Group, a core element of Strangeway's plan

Strangeways's objections were strong, and having responsibility for the plan's implementation, he refused to undertake most of the physical deception. A power struggle ensued throughout February and early March between Ops (B) and Strangeways as to who had authority to implement each part of the deception plan. Montgomery put his full support behind his head of deception and so Strangeways prevailed. Finally, in a 23 February meeting between R Force and Ops (B), Strangeways tore up a copy of the plan, declared it useless, and announced that he would rewrite it from scratch. The established deceivers were dubious about Strangeways's announcement and assumed that he would resubmit the existing plan with some modifications. However, he duly submitted a rewritten operation that was met, in Harmer's words, with "astonishment".

=== Quicksilver ===
Strangeways's revised Fortitude plan and an operational implementation, dubbed Quicksilver, invented an entire new field army but crucially without significant fictional forces. The skeleton of the new force already existed in the form of the First United States Army Group (FUSAG), commanded by Omar Bradley. It had been formed for administrative purposes but never used, but the Germans had discovered its existence through radio intercepts. Strangeways proposed activating the unit, with a series of fictional and real formations. The order of battle for the army would be intended to represent the bulk of Allied forces in England and therefore the main Allied threat. To add credence to the importance of FUSAG, Bradley was replaced by Lieutenant General George Patton, whom the Germans held in high regard and who was known to be a competitor to Montgomery.

The Fortitude South story would be that FUSAG was being prepared to invade Pas-de-Calais some weeks after an initial diversionary invasion. That would allow Operation Neptune's landings to be passed off as a distraction from the later main invasion. Pas-de-Calais offered a number of advantages over the real invasion site, such as by being the shortest crossing of the English Channel and the quickest route into Germany. As a result, Erwin Rommel had taken steps to fortify that area of coastline heavily. Strangeways felt that would help the deception seem realistic in the minds of German high command.

A deception of such a size required significant organisation and input from many organisations, including MI5, MI6, SHAEF via Ops B, and the armed services. Information from the various deception agencies was organised by and channelled through the London Controlling Section. To help keep the approach well-organised, Strangeways divided the implementation stages into six subplans, codenamed Quicksilver.

Quicksilver Sub-Plans
Plan	Special Means	Description
Quicksilver I	Leaks	The basic "story" of Fortitude South was to be leaked, under Quicksilver I, largely through the double agent network and some diplomatic channels.
Quicksilver II	Wireless traffic	Radio deception was used to simulate the movement of troops across the south of England, with German listening posts expected to pick up the traffic.
Quicksilver III	Physical deception	A display of dummy landing craft, including associated simulated wireless traffic, road signs, and restricted areas.
Quicksilver IV	Physical preparations	Any invasion target would have been prepared with attacks in advance of landings and so Quicksilver IV covered a number of air activities including bombing of the Pas-de-Calais beach area and tactical railway bombing immediately before D-Day.
Quicksilver V	Physical Deception	Overall increased activity around Dover (such as by giving impression of extra tunnelling and additional wireless stations) to suggest embarkation preparations.
Quicksilver VI	Physical Deception	Night lighting deception to simulate activity at night in places that dummy landing craft were situated.

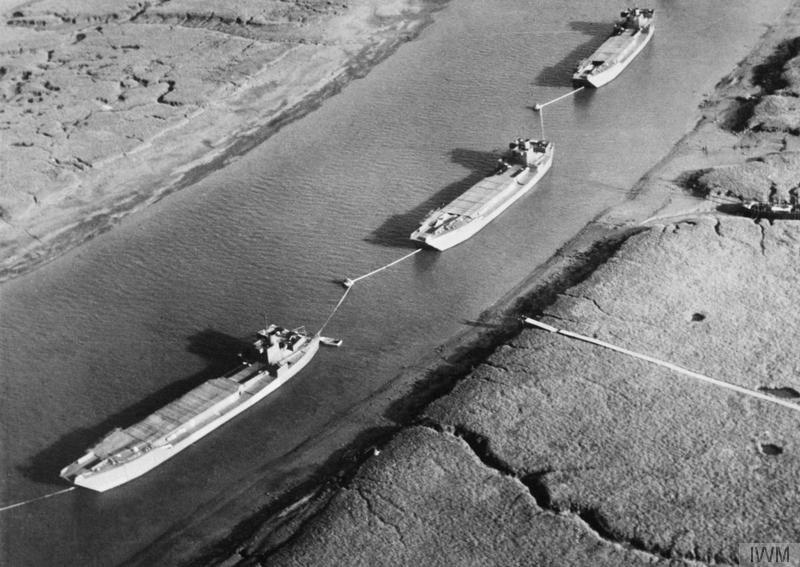
Dummy landing craft, used during Fortitude, at an unknown location in the South-East of England

The FUSAG deception was not implemented primarily with dummy tanks, aeroplanes, or other vehicles. At that stage of the war, the Germans were unable to fly reconnaissance planes over England and so Strangeways felt that such effort would have been wasted. (Note: It has been suggested that the Army later encouraged the idea that the dummies were used to draw attention away from some of the other means of deception, such as double agents.) However, temporary buildings were constructed and dummy landing craft were stationed at likely embarkation points in the East and the South-East of England. As the FUSAG commander, Patton paid many of them a visit, along with a photographer, to ensure that their location was noted. The landing craft, built from wood and canvas and nicknamed Bigbob's, suffered from being too light. Wind and rain flipped many of them over or ran them to ground during the operation.

Instead of extensive physical measures, most of Strangeway's plan relied on radio signals and leaks through double agents. Managing that information flow had to be done with caution since leaking supposed top-secret invasion plans would have been very obvious. Instead, the deceivers used tactics developed by Clarke in Cairo. Agents were allowed to report minutiae such as insignia on soldiers' uniforms and unit markings on vehicles to allow the Germans to build up a picture. The observations in the south-central areas largely gave accurate information about the real invasion forces since Clarke had stressed that using as much real information as possible led to better outcomes. Reports from the South-West of England indicated few troop sightings, but in reality, many units were housed there in preparation for D-Day. Reports from the South-East depicted largely-notional Quicksilver forces. That approach aimed to convince German intelligence services of an order of battle for the Allied forces that placed the centre of gravity of the invasion force opposite Pas-de-Calais.

Fortitude South II included the U.S. XXXIII Corps. The corps was first reported to the Germans as arriving in June 1944, disembarking at Liverpool and establishing its headquarters in Marbury, Cheshire, with the US 11th Infantry Division, US 48th Infantry Division and US 25th Armored Division under its command. In July the corps and the units under its command were reported as moving to take up positions vacated by US XX Corps as it departed for Normandy.

== Fortitude North ==
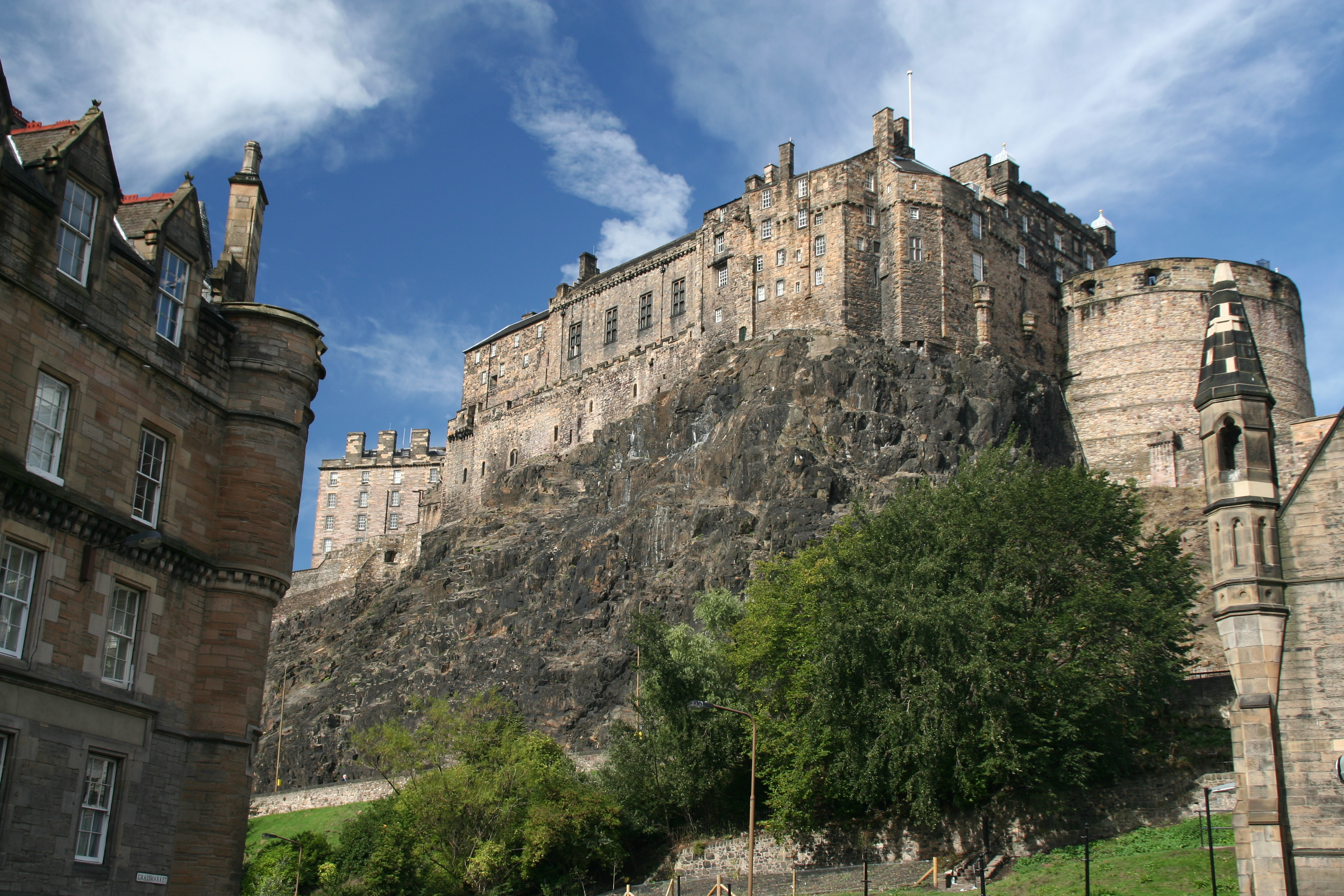
Edinburgh Castle, the headquarters of the fictional British Fourth Army during Operation Fortitude

Fortitude North was designed to mislead the Germans into expecting an invasion of Norway. By threatening any weakened Norwegian defence, the Allies hoped to prevent or to delay reinforcement of France after the Normandy invasion. The plan involved simulating a buildup of forces in northern England and political contact with Sweden.

During a similar operation in 1943, Operation Tindall, a fictional field army (British Fourth Army) had been created, headquartered in Edinburgh Castle. It was decided to continue to use the same force during Fortitude. Unlike its southern counterpart, the deception relied primarily on fake radio traffic since it was judged unlikely that German reconnaissance planes could reach Scotland without being intercepted. False information about the arrival of troops in the area was reported by the double agents Mutt and Jeff, who had surrendered after their 1941 landing in the Moray Firth, and the British media co-operated by broadcasting fake information, such as football scores or wedding announcements, to nonexistent troops. Fortitude North was so successful that by late spring 1944, Hitler had positioned 13 army divisions in Norway.

In the early spring of 1944, British commandos attacked targets in Norway to simulate preparations for invasion. They destroyed industrial targets, such as shipping and power infrastructure and military outposts. That coincided with an increase in naval activity in the northern seas and in political pressure on neutral Sweden.

Similar to the operation in the south, Fortitude North had a subsidiary plan used to implement the extensive radio deceptions. Codenamed Operation Skye, it began on 22 March 1944, was overseen by Colonel R. M. McLeod, and became fully operational by 6 April. Skye was split into four sections, relating to different divisions of the Fourth Army. (Note: Operation Skye: (I) Fourth Army headquarters, (II) British II Corps, (III) American XV Corps (a genuine formation but with fictional units added to its order of battle), (IV) British VII Corps.)

== After invasion ==
On 20 July, Ops (B) took over control of Fortitude South from R Force. The previous month, it had begun work to follow up the operation. The new story centered on the idea that Eisenhower had decided to defeat the Germans through the existing beachhead. As a result, elements of FUSAG had been detached and sent to reinforce Normandy, and a second smaller Second American Army Group (SUSAG) would be formed to threaten the Pas-de-Calais.

The plan again met criticism from Strangeways. Firstly, he opposed the creation of so many fictional US formations in the face of a known manpower shortage. Secondly, the new plan reduced the threat to Pas-de-Calais which might give the German command confidence to move the Fifteenth Army to reinforce Normandy. As before, in late June, Strangeways rewrote the operation to ensure that the focus remained on Calais. In his version, the Normandy beachhead was struggling to succeed and so Eisenhower had taken elements of FUSAG to reinforce its efforts. FUSAG would then be rebuilt with newly-arrived US formations with the aim of landing in France toward the end of July.

In order to explain Patton's appearance in Normandy, news was transmitted of a rumour that Patton had refused to transfer any of his units to Montgomery's 21st Army Group, and as a result had been demoted and given the lesser command of the Third United States Army. His replacement at FUSAG was Lieutenant General Lesley J. McNair, but after touring Southeast England, he visited Normandy where he was accidentally killed on 24 July in an Allied air raid and was subsequently replaced by General John L. DeWitt.

Through the evolved plan, the Allies maintained the pretense of FUSAG and other forces threatening Pas-de-Calais for some considerable time after D-Day, possibly even as late as September 1944. That was vital to the success of the Allied plan by forcing the Germans to keep most of their reserves bottled up in wait for an attack on Calais that never came. That allowed the Allies to maintain and to build upon their foothold in Normandy. Having served its purpose, on 28 September 1944, it was agreed to end the Fortitude deception and to move any remaining operational deceptions in the field to the overall charge of Ops (B).

== Impact ==
The Allies were able to judge how well Fortitude worked because of Ultra, the signals intelligence that was obtained by breaking German codes and ciphers. On 1 June, a decrypted transmission by Hiroshi Ōshima, the Japanese ambassador, to his government recounted a recent conversation with Hitler and confirmed the effectiveness of Fortitude. When asked for Hitler's thoughts on the Allied battle plan, he had said, "I think that diversionary actions will take place in a number of places – against Norway, Denmark, the southern part of western France, and the French Mediterranean coast." He added that he expected the Allies would then attack in force across the Strait of Dover.

The deception was also assisted by very high German assessments of Allied capabilities. In an appreciation of 8 May, von Rundstedt said:

Observed tonnage of landing shipping could be taken as sufficient for 12 or 13 divisions (less heavy equipment and rear elements) for fairly short sea routes. In all (estimating the capacity of the other English ports not so far covered by visual and photo recce) probable employment of at least 20 and probably more divisions in first wave must be expected. To these must be added strong air-landing forces.

During the course of Fortitude, the almost-complete lack of German aerial reconnaissance, together with the absence of uncontrolled German agents in Britain, came to make physical deception almost irrelevant. The unreliability of "diplomatic leaks" resulted in their discontinuance. Most deception in the south was carried out by means of false wireless traffic and through German double agents. However, those methods had significantly less impact for Fortitude North. In his 2000 book, Fortitude: The D-Day Deception Campaign, Roger Fleetwood-Hesketh, a member of Ops (B), concluded that "no evidence has so far been found to show that wireless deception or visual misdirection made any contribution." It is thought that the Germans were not actually monitoring the radio traffic that was being simulated.

Overall, Fortitude was successful for several reasons:

- The long-term view taken by British Intelligence to cultivate double agents as channels of disinformation to the enemy.
- The use of Ultra decrypts of machine-encrypted messages between the Abwehr and the German High Command, which quickly indicated the effectiveness of deception tactics. That is one of the early uses of a closed-loop deception system. The messages were usually encrypted by Fish, rather than Enigma machines.
- Reginald Victor Jones, the Assistant Director Intelligence (Science) at the British Air Ministry, insisted that for reasons of tactical deception, for every radar station attacked within the real invasion area, two were to be attacked outside it.
- The extensive nature of the German intelligence machinery and the rivalry among the various elements.
- General George Patton was the leader whom the Germans feared the most, and they considered him the Allies' best general. Therefore, the German High Command believed that he would lead the daring attack.

One author says that on 5 June before he gave the Go message for Overlord, Eisenhower received a message that was couriered from Bletchley Park and had been sent by Hitler to Rommel with battle orders that the invasion of Normandy was imminent but that it was a feint to draw troops away from the real invasion five days later against the Channel Ports, and Rommel was not to move any troops. That would mean that the Allies would have five days without determined opposition. It was sent in a Fish radio message and decrypted using Colossus, according to an account by Tommy Flowers. Another author doubts whether Hitler would have sent messages about the invasion at the time since the invasion fleet had sailed on 4 June but was then postponed for 24 hours, and even with Colossus, Fish decrypts could take days or weeks. He thinks that Flowers may have embellished or misremembered the story in later life. Hitler’s views on the real invasion are widely attributed to the message from the Japanese ambassador to Berlin, Ōshima, after a 27 May meeting. Anyway, during the first week of June 1944, Eisenhower was more concerned with the weather than whether the Germans had been misled about the invasion's location.

== Fictional depictions ==
Operation Fortitude was classified, along with all of the wartime deceptions, and initial accounts did not emerge until the 1970s. Once published, however, the story inspired a number of fictional accounts:

- Eye of the Needle is a 1978 novel by Ken Follett about a Nazi spy stationed in the south of England who discovers the Allied deception and races to inform the German leadership. It was subsequently adapted into a 1981 film of the same name, starring Donald Sutherland.
- Fall from Grace is a 1986 novel by Larry Collins about a French agent, Catherine Pradier, who risks her life to deceive the Nazis as to where and when the Allies will invade the Continent of Europe and begin the end of World War II.
- Jack Higgins's 1991 novel The Eagle Has Flown ends with a conference between Adolf Hitler and two-high ranking German military intelligence officers, including Abwehr head Wilhelm Canaris, who are solidly convinced that the Allies are planning to invade Normandy, but Hitler is unswayed from his belief that Calais is the intended target.
- The Unlikely Spy is a 1996 novel by Daniel Silva that likewise focuses on Allied attempts to carry out Fortitude as well as a German agent's race to discover the true plans.
- Goodnight Sweetheart is a BBC TV comedy series that features a time-traveller, Gary Sparrow. In two episodes of Series 5 aired in 1998, Gary, when he returns to 1944, appears to be the double of one of General Charles de Gaulle's aides. He is used in that guise by MI5 and is sent to Calais; he makes contact with the French Resistance but is captured by the Gestapo. All of that was planned to reinforce the Pas-de-Calais invasion deception. Luckily, Gary is able to escape and to return to England.
- Blackout and All Clear, is a 2010 two-volume novel by Connie Willis, about time-travelling historians who study the events of the Battle of Britain. One of the historians, posing as an American journalist, ends up working for Operation Fortitude.
- In a lawsuit, aspiring screenwriter Simon Afram stated that he gave director Martin Scorsese $500,000 to develop his screenplay about the event, which was titled Operation Fortitude, only for Scorsese to then do nothing. The lawsuit would be settled in March 2024.
