= Operation Cockade =

WWII Allied intelligence operation

- Part of the Western Front of World War II
Date	September 1943 – 5 November 1943
Location	Western Front
Result	Allied failure

Belligerents
Germany	United Kingdom; United States; Canada

Commanders and leaders
(Nazi Germany) Adolf Hitler (Nazi Germany) Gerd von Rundstedt	(United Kingdom) Frederick E. Morgan (United States) Ira C. Eaker

Strength
~22 Divisions	(United Kingdom) Bomber Command (United States) Eighth Air Force; ~13 Divisions

Casualties and losses
None	(France) 376 civilians Village of Le Portel flattened

Operation Cockade was a series of deception operations designed to alleviate German pressure on Allied operations in Sicily and on the Soviets on the Eastern Front by feinting various attacks into Western Europe during World War II. The Allies hoped to use Cockade to force the Luftwaffe into a massive air battle with the Royal Air Force and US Eighth Air Force to give the Allies air superiority over Western Europe. Cockade involved three deception operations: Operation Starkey, Operation Wadham and Operation Tindall. Operation Starkey was set to occur in early September, Operation Tindall in mid-September and Operation Wadham in late September 1943.

== Background ==
In March 1943, General Frederick E. Morgan was appointed as chief of staff to the Supreme Allied Commander (Note: At the time a Supreme Allied Commander had not been appointed – Eisenhower would assume the position in December 1943) (COSSAC), and he was tasked with operational planning in Northwestern Europe. Morgan's operational orders from Allied high command were received in April, and they referred to "an elaborate camouflage and deception" with the dual aims of keeping German forces in the west and drawing the Luftwaffe into an air battle. Deception strategy fell to the London Controlling Section (LCS), a Whitehall department that had been established in 1941 and was then run by Colonel John Bevan. Bevan convinced Morgan to establish a specialist deception section on his staff, but Morgan's hierarchy was unable to accommodate it and so a department, Ops (B), was set up within the "G-3" operations division. (Note: COSSAC was set up in the style of American forces (hence the G-3 department), which had no concept of deception at the top level of operations) A deception also required at least one notional amphibious invasion of the French coast.

The real cross-channel invasion had already been postponed until 1944 and the main Allied push that year was toward Southern Europe. Morgan's task was to help pin the enemy down in the west.

Allied military deception then revolved around constructing a story to sell to the enemy. For 1943 Ops (B) and the LCS, under the direction from Morgan, created three plans (Tindall, Starkey and Wadham), which received the overall codename Cockade. The plans were submitted for approval by the Chiefs of Staff on June 3 and approved twenty days later.

Cockade began with Tindall, a threat against Norway from units based in Scotland. That invasion would then be called off to allow a dual amphibious attack on France (Starkey and Wadham) from early September. The French assault would be similarly called off and Tindall reinstated until the winter. The deceptions would be carried out via double agents; decoy signals, fake troop concentrations; commando raids; and increased reconnaissance and bombing missions into the areas of Boulogne, Brest and Norway.

== Operation Starkey ==
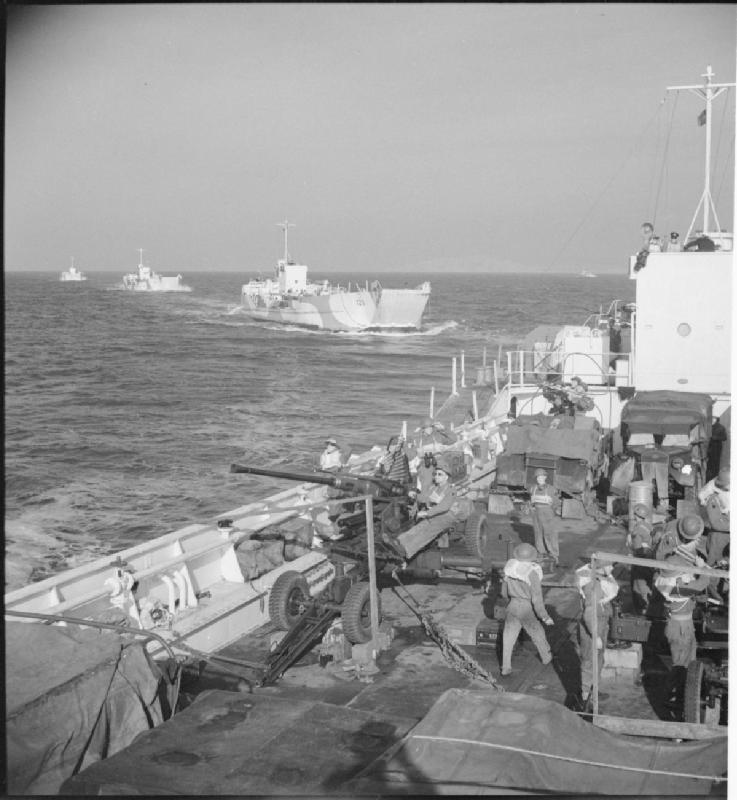
54th LAA Bofors during Exercise Harlequin, 11 September 1943

Operation Starkey was a sham British and Canadian amphibious invasion into the Boulogne area, in northern France. For the United States, the original plan involved 2,300 heavy bomber, 3,700 fighter and 400 medium bomber sorties against targets near Boulogne. The goal was to convince the Germans that the British and Canadian invasion preparations were authentic. The British were to provide another 3,000 heavy bomber sorties into the Boulogne area. Starkey was to culminate with a large feint involving an amphibious force aboard 30 ships, operating off the Boulogne coast, in the hope of luring the Luftwaffe. The army part of the exercise was named Exercise or Operation Harlequin.

Starkey encountered difficulties from the start. Major General Ira C. Eaker, the commander of the Eighth Air Force, criticised the Starkey plan by saying that it would force the Americans to abandon their strategic bombing offensive. In a letter to Supreme Headquarters, Allied Expeditionary Force (SHAEF), Eaker stated that Starkey called for 2,300 heavy-bomber sorties over 14 days "when the command had only flown 5,356 combat sorties in the past 8 months." Although Eaker convinced SHAEF to lower the American commitment to three hundred heavy-bomber sorties, he promised to provide as many bomber sorties as possible from new bomber units undergoing training. When it was over, Eighth Air Force had flown a total of 1,841 bomber sorties.

Other problems were encountered as well. Headquarters, VIII Air Support Command, noted that Starkey's planners had difficulty in agreeing on the rules of engagement for targets in Occupied France. The British and Americans unknowingly duplicated efforts on several occasions by flying the same missions within a few days of each other. The Royal Navy did not fully endorse the deception plan either since the Starkey planners had wanted two battleships for the amphibious force to act as bait for the Luftwaffe, but the navy was unwilling to risk its battleships in such a manner. Because of that opposition, Starkey's planners had to make several amendments to the deception plan.

Despite those issues, Starkey provided a useful practical lesson in the complexity and the scale of the logistical supply chain that are needed to maintain flexible support to an invading force. Starkey also contributed to the perception that the Pas-de-Calais was the primary candidate for the invasion.

== Operation Wadham ==
Planners for Operation Wadham wanted the Germans to believe that the Americans were going to invade in the area of Brest, a seaport on the Breton Peninsula. The hoax involved minimal "real" forces, with a notional amphibious group sailing directly from the United States and another force from Britain with ten divisions in all, to conduct an invasion at Brest. The premise was that the Americans were planning to invade Brest after the successful invasion at Boulogne. However, the air commitment for the plan was considerably less than Starkey's, Eaker also criticised Wadham by saying that the combined bomber offensive would more effectively destroy the Luftwaffe than the diverted bomber resources could provide in support of Wadham. Other than aircraft, the Americans had to provide only 75 dummy landing craft to aid in the deception effort.

The primary weakness in Wadham's story was that the US forces were going to land outside of Allied tactical air support range. Prior to the operation, the Army Operations Branch called Wadham a "very weak plan" but stated that it was "essential as a part of Cockade to reinforce Starkey."

The notional order of battle for Operation Wadham included the following:

- Task Force 'A': Headquarters V Corps, the 5th Infantry Division, the 29th Infantry Division, the 46th Infantry Division, the 3rd Armored Division, and the 101st Airborne Division.
- Task Force 'B': Headquarters VII Corps, the 2nd Infantry Division, 4th Infantry Division, the 8th Infantry Division, the 31st Infantry Division, the 4th Armored Division, and the 76th Artillery Brigade.

== Operation Tindall ==
Operation Tindall was a deception that the British and Americans were going to attack Norway. The hypothetical goal was capturing Stavanger and its airfield, which were critical to the story. That was because once again, the Allies were planning a deception operation beyond the range of tactical air support and so they needed to increase the plan's plausibility. The five divisions that were to be used in the sham invasion were real divisions camped in Scotland, and the Allies had adequate aircraft and ships in Scotland to make the deception plan plausible. The only shortfall that the Allies had with Tindall was their lack of military gliders. The Allies hoped that Tindall would induce the Germans to retain the 12 divisions that had been assigned to Norway.

== Result ==
Operation Cockade failed to achieve its objectives, mostly because German leadership did not believe the Allies were going to invade Western Europe in 1943 and Cockade did not trigger the air battle the Allies desired. The main exception to German High Command was Generalfeldmarschall (Field Marshal) Gerd von Rundstedt, the commander-in-chief of Western Command, who believed the Allies were going to invade at Boulogne and was angry at the German High Command for removing ten divisions from France. The invasion stories, particularly Starkey and Wadham, were implausible and so were not believed. There were no significant German reactions to the deception operations. The most notable of the nonreactions was the lack of air reconnaissance and naval or Luftwaffe response to the Starkey amphibious feint. Germans moved ten divisions out of northern France to other theatres, which indicated that Starkey and Wadham were complete failures.

In Norway, the Germans retained the twelve divisions, which indicates the Germans assessed a higher threat there. Besides being implausible, Cockade also failed because the Allies did not work hard enough to make the deception look real. The Royal Navy would not risk its battleships, and Eaker did not want to divert resources from the strategic bombing offensive. Cockade had one success since the Germans believed the story that the Allies had 51 divisions in the British Isles although there were only 17 divisions. That became important in deception operations in 1944.

Cockade was best summarised by Sir Arthur "Bomber" Harris, the commander of RAF Bomber Command, when he said that the deception plan had been "at best a piece of harmless play acting."
