= Roger Fleetwood-Hesketh =

Lieutenant-Colonel Roger Fleetwood Hesketh OBE TD DL JP
- Born: Roger Bibby-Hesketh; 28 July 1902
- Died: 14 November 1987 (aged 85)
- Military career
- Allegiance: United Kingdom
- Branch: British Army
- Rank: Lieutenant-Colonel (Honorary Colonel, Duke of Lancaster's Own Yeomanry)
- Service number: 22275
- Unit: Duke of Lancaster's Own Yeomanry
- Conflicts: Second World War
- Awards: Legion of Merit, Degree of Officer, 1948; Officer of the Order of the British Empire, 1970

Lieutenant-Colonel Roger Fleetwood Hesketh OBE TD DL JP (28 July 1902 – 14 November 1987), born Roger Bibby-Hesketh, was a Conservative Party politician in the United Kingdom. He was Member of Parliament (MP) for Southport from 1952 to 1959.

== Early life ==
Roger Bibby-Hesketh was the first of six children born to Major Charles Hesketh Fleetwood-Hesketh (1871–1947) and his wife Anne Dorothea (née Brocklebank) Fleetwood-Hesketh (1877–1940). His mother died in the torpedoing and sinking of the British ocean liner SS City of Benares in September 1940, along with 257 others including 81 children.

Hesketh was educated at Eton from where, in 1922, he was commissioned into the Duke of Lancaster's Own Yeomanry as a 2nd Lieutenant. He attended university at Christ Church, Oxford, and was called to bar in 1928 at the Middle Temple.

== Second World War ==
During the Second World War, in February 1940, then at the rank of Major, he transferred to the Royal Artillery from the Yeomanry.

As Lieutenant Colonel, Fleetwood-Hesketh was a member of Ops (B), the deception section of SHAEF that helped plan Operation Fortitude, a key portion of Operation Bodyguard, the deception plan covering the Allied invasion of Normandy in 1944. He wrote a history of his role and the operation that was published after his death.

Following the end of the war, Hesketh was sent to Germany, alongside his brother, to search through the files of German intelligence, and question officers. He was then asked to write a history of deception in Western Europe, including the work up to and including Operation Fortitude.

In the 1970s books about Second World War deception began to appear. Sefton Delmer's 1971 book, The Counterfeit Spy, appeared to be copied from Hesketh's earlier unpublished report. Noel Wild had provided Delmer with a copy of the report. Hesketh was annoyed and threatened to sue. However, the Government claimed Crown Copyright on his report and he was not able to. In the end Delmer added a credit to the second edition of the book, and Hesketh and other deceivers were able to correct inaccuracies.

Hesketh's report was eventually published posthumously in 1999, with a foreword by "Nigel West" (the pseudonym of Rupert Allason).

== Political career ==
Hesketh was High Sheriff of Lancashire in 1947 and later Deputy Lieutenant of Lancashire from 1950 to 1972. He remained a reserve officer in the Territorial Army, with the honorary rank of Colonel, until 1957.

In 1948, Hesketh was awarded an American Legion of Merit (Degree of Officer). In 1970, he was appointed Officer (Civil Division) of the Order of the British Empire, at the time he was chairman of the Lancashire Agricultural Executive Committee.

His name changed twice: the first time in 1907, when his father changed the family name from Bibby-Hesketh to Fleetwood-Hesketh, and on 10 August 1956, when he changed his name by deed poll to the unhyphenated form of Roger Fleetwood Hesketh.

In the 1960s, Hesketh rebuilt the family home of Meols Hall, Southport (he had a hobbyist interest in architecture). He died in 1987.

Parliament of the United Kingdom
Preceded by Robert Hudson	Member of Parliament for Southport; 1952–1959	Succeeded by Ian Percival
