= David Strangeways =

David Inderwick Strangeways DSO, OBE (26 February 1912 – 1 August 1998) was a colonel in the British Army who helped organise several military deceptions during World War II. After leaving the army in 1957, he took holy orders.

== Early life ==
Strangeways was born in Cambridge, the third son of Dr. T. S. P. Strangeways, founder of the Strangeways Research Laboratory. He attended Cambridgeshire High School for Boys and later Trinity Hall, Cambridge, reading History.

== Military career ==
Strangeways was commissioned into the Duke of Wellington's Regiment in 1933 and served in the 1st Battalion based at Aldershot then Malta. After the outbreak of World War II, he was sent to France where he participated in a rearguard action while the British forces tried to reach Dunkirk. Strangeways successfully managed to evacuate part of his battalion on a Thames barge.

=== Deception ===
In 1942, Strangeways' career in military deception began in earnest. Sent from the War Office in London to Cairo, he reported to General Sir Harold Alexander with deception plans designed to fool the Axis powers as to the time and place of the Allied invasion of North Africa. The deception relied upon convincing the Axis powers that the massed landing craft were destined not for North Africa but to relieve beleaguered Malta. To bring about the deception, novelist and fellow deception officer Dennis Wheatley, based at the London Controlling Section, supplied Strangeways with a letter to an acquaintance in Cairo and a copy of his latest novel. The book, with the letter left inside, was then left at a Cairo hotel for enemy agents to find.

Strangeways then joined Brigadier Dudley Clarke's A-Force. His job was to use deception to gain a strategic and tactical advantage over the enemy in the Near and Middle East. He achieved this by using radio nets to broadcast false information. Decoy tanks and other vehicles were used in order to divert Axis forces away from the areas of Allied attack. Using a combination of bluff, boldness and speed, Strangeways was able to seize the German headquarters at Tunis before the Germans could destroy their secret documents.

In 1943, General Bernard Montgomery took command of 21st Army Group and requested that Strangeways take charge of R-Force. This was principally a deception force and consisted of armoured vehicles, field engineers and a wireless unit. Strangeways developed Operation Quicksilver, a significant part of Operation Fortitude, with the aim of fooling the Germans that the Allied invasion of Europe would take place at the Pas-de-Calais.

=== Post-war ===
After the Allies' victory over Nazi Germany, Strangeways was given the role of political adviser to the Allied Commissioners for Westphalia and the Rhine. This role was a combination of intelligence work, administration of German detainees and border control. Later, following two staff appointments in England, Strangeways briefly joined the Green Howards. In 1949, a posting to the British Military Mission in Greece saw him advising the Greek government.

In 1952, Strangeways took command of the 1st Battalion the East Yorkshire Regiment. The regiment was on a three-year tour of Malaya and engaged in fighting the Communist insurgency during the Malayan Emergency.

== Theological career ==
Strangeways left the Army in 1957 to attend Wells Theological College and gain Anglican holy orders. In 1958, his first appointment was as curate of Lee-on-the-Solent. From 1961 to 1965, he was vicar at Symondsbury, Dorset, followed by eight years at Holy Trinity Church, Bradford on Avon. He served as Chaplain at St Peter and St Sigfrid's Church in Stockholm and, in 1977, became Chancellor and Senior Canon of St Paul's Pro-Cathedral, Malta.

Strangeways retired in 1981 and returned to England, continuing to serve as a priest in the dioceses of St Edmundsbury and Ipswich and Norwich.
