= John Bevan (British Army officer) =

British Army officer (1894–1978)

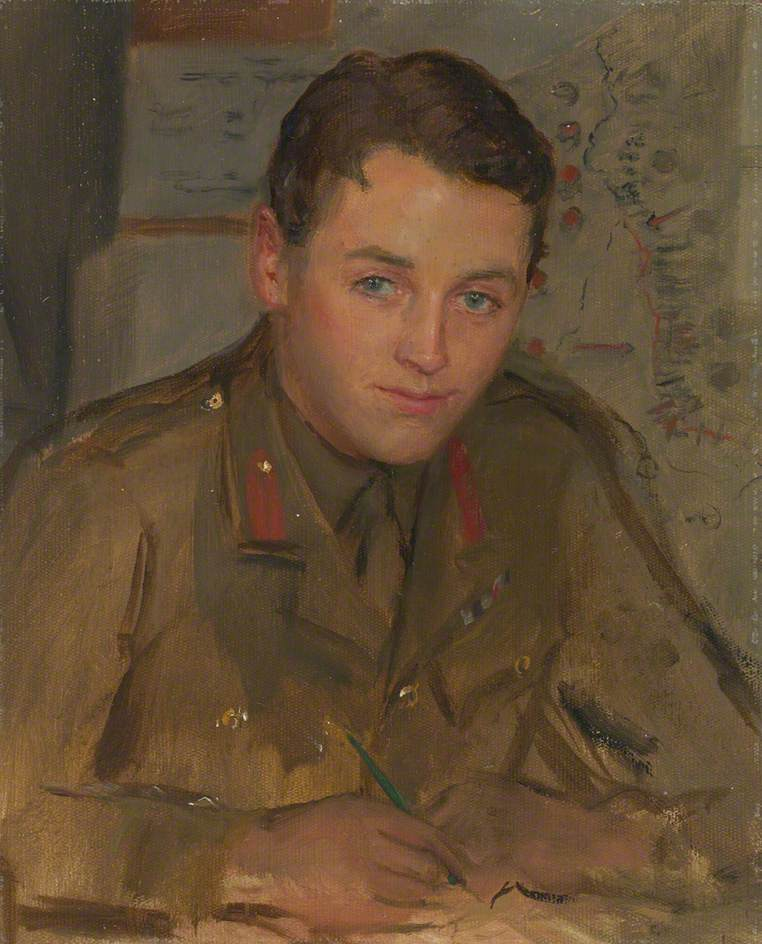
- Bevan as a captain at the Supreme War Council in 1918
- Born: 5 April 1894
- Died: 3 December 1978 (aged 84); London, England
- Military career
- Allegiance: United Kingdom
- Branch: British Army
- Service years: 1914–1946
- Rank: Colonel
- Service number: 50751
- Units: Hertfordshire Regiment, London Controlling Section
- Conflicts: First World War; Second World War
- Awards: Companion of the Order of the Bath; Military Cross; Efficiency Decoration; Legion of Merit (United States)

Colonel John Henry Bevan CB, MC, TD (5 April 1894 – 3 December 1978) was a British Army officer who, during the Second World War, made an important contribution to military deception, culminating in Operation Bodyguard, the plan to conceal the D-Day landings in Normandy. In civilian life he was a respected stockbroker in his father's firm.

Bevan had an upper-class upbringing, including an education at Eton and Oxford. During the First World War he fought with the Hertfordshire Regiment in France and later became involved with intelligence analysis. His latter work came to the attention of wartime leaders, including Winston Churchill. Bevan stayed in the army for a while following the end of the war, and then took up a career in stock brokerage. He joined his father's firm, got married, and built up his profile as an honest businessman.

At the outbreak of the Second World War, Bevan was recalled to his Territorial Army regiment and assigned as a staff officer during the early campaigns in Norway. In 1941 he was seconded to the London Controlling Section (LCS), a department set up to oversee strategic deception planning for the Allies. Oliver Stanley, the LCS's previous head, was in the process of returning to politics so Bevan was given command of the unit.

Upon his arrival the LCS was struggling to maintain its authority against the armed forces establishment. Bevan and his deputy, Dennis Wheatley, used their social connections (and a broad charter from high command) to enable the department to put plans into operation. In 1943 Bevan helped establish Ops (B) (a deception department within COSSAC) and plan Operation Cockade. Intended to tie up German forces in western Europe, the operation was not a success. However, building on the lessons learned from Cockade (and from Dudley Clarke in the Mediterranean) Bevan created Operation Bodyguard, which historians agree contributed to the success of the Operation Overlord landings in 1944.

== Early life ==
Bevan was born in London on 5 April 1894, the youngest of five children, to David Augustus Bevan and Dame Maude Elizabeth Bevan. He attended Eton College and became Keepers of Fives, a member of Pop and was known to excel at cricket. From Eton, Bevan went up to Christ Church, Oxford until the outbreak of the First World War. In August 1914, he left to join the Hertfordshire Regiment of the Territorial Force. He fought with the 1/1st battalion of the regiment on the Western Front, earning the Military Cross in 1917, and attaining the rank of captain.

In early 1918 Bevan became a staff officer under Field Marshal Henry Wilson. He was tasked with writing an appraisal of the current German order of battle, a report he delivered in front of the Allied command; including Prime Minister Lloyd George and Winston Churchill. The clarity of Bevan's predictions, which proved accurate just a few weeks later, impressed Churchill, who insisted on a private meeting.

Following the end of the war Bevan was kept in the army, although it is not known in what role. In previous years he had been involved in some form of tactical deception (he later wrote: "I had great fun with this in the First World War"), a first taste of his career during the Second World War, and it is likely this post-war job involved some kind of intelligence work. After finally being demobilised Bevan decided to pursue his father's career, that of a stockbroker. He joined Hambros bank and was dispatched to their Danish office; there he successfully learned to speak Danish and continued his sporting interests, winning several trophies.

Bevan moved back the London and in 1925 became a partner at David A. Bevan & Co., his father's firm. Two years later he married Lady Barbara Bingham, daughter of the Earl of Lucan. During the inter-war period Bevan built his career as a broker and businessman, one known for honesty and integrity.

== Second World War ==
In 1939 Bevan was recalled as an officer, working for MI5. However, in short order he was reposted to the Territorials and served as a staff officer during the Norwegian campaign. Here he became acquainted with Peter Fleming (another notable deceiver). The pair operated small tactical deceptions – the first documented example of Bevan's involvement in deception.

Following the failure of the British campaign in Norway, Bevan was assigned to Western Command in the mundane role of Duty Intelligence Officer.

=== London Controlling Section ===
In September 1941, Dudley Clarke was summoned to London to give a report on his deception work in the North African campaign. Allied high command were impressed with Clarke's ideas and asked him to set up a "Controlling Section" in the capital. Clarke refused and returned to Cairo. Instead Colonel Oliver Stanley was appointed as the first controlling officer. Stanley, and his early staff, had limited success because of the political climate, and a lack of operations to plan for.

Bevan was posted at the end of May 1942 to a subordinate position at the London Controlling Section. However, Stanley, who was taking extensive sick leave to care for his terminally ill wife, had petitioned Churchill to be allowed back into politics. At the same time General Archibald Wavell sent Churchill a personal note emphasising the importance of deception and, specifically, strategic organisation from London. The note seemed to have an effect; Stanley's request was granted and Bevan found himself named London Control, with a much broader charter.

One of the existing officers at the LCS was author Dennis Wheatley, whose social connections were even better than Bevan's. The pair teamed up, with Wheatley named Deputy Controlling Officer, and set out to wine, dine and otherwise raise the department's profile.

=== Operation Cockade ===
In March 1943, General Frederick E. Morgan was appointed chief of staff to the Supreme Allied Commander (COSSAC), and tasked with operational planning in Northwest Europe. Bevan helped to set up Morgan's deception staff, a department under the G-3 Operations division known as Ops (B).

That year the Allied focus was on the Mediterranean (the invasion of France having been postponed till 1944), so Morgan, Ops (B) and the LCS were given the task of tying up German forces in the west via deception, with particular focus on drawing the Luftwaffe into air battles. Bevan worked with the Ops (B) head Jervis-Read to draft three deception plans ("Starkey", "Wadham" and "Tindall") under the overall name "Cockade". Cockade's story started with a threatened invasion of Norway from Scotland ("Tindall"), followed by a dual invasion of the Calais region ("Starkey" and "Wadham") in September, and finally a revival of "Tindall" until winter weather made operations that year impossible.

By this point the LCS had a much broader remit with regards deception; Bevan had a seat on the Twenty Committee (controlling information passed to the Germans via double agents) and the department focused on strategic planning, rather than operational details.

=== Operation Bodyguard ===
In 1943 Allied high command decided that the following year would see the invasion of Europe, with Normandy chosen as the landing site. The LCS vied with Ops. B (another deception agency, set up under the Chief of Staff to the Supreme Commander Allied Forces). On 14 July Bevan published a paper entitled "First Thoughts"; by August he had developed this into Plan Jael (a reference to the Old Testament heroine who killed an enemy commander by deception). The Jael deception would have attempted to convince the Axis that Allied strategy for 1944 was focused on the Balkan theatre, and air bombardment of Germany, in preparation for an invasion in 1945. The plan received a lukewarm reception from high command.

Instead, they favoured "Appendix Y" of the Operation Overlord plan, also known as "Torrent", written by Ops. B staff. Its early ideas of feint attacks and fake build-up of troops in southern and northern England were the foundation of Operation Bodyguard. Ops. B recognised that the Allies would be unable to hide an invasion force indefinitely, and that any deception should focus on misleading the enemy as to the exact date and location of attack.

Final strategy for 1944 was agreed by the Allied leadership in November and December 1943 (at conferences in Cairo and Tehran). Bevan was told to take the Ops. B plan and expand it into a full deception strategy. Furnished with the final details of Overlord, Bevan returned to London on 6 December to complete a draft plan. Now codenamed "Bodyguard", it was approved on Christmas Day, 1943. The new name had been chosen following a comment by Churchill to Joseph Stalin at the Tehran conference: "In wartime, truth is so precious that she should always be attended by a bodyguard of lies."

== Post-war ==
On 12 April 1945, Bevan was awarded the Efficiency Decoration, a medal for long-serving members of the Territorial Army. On 6 October he left the army, having reached the age limit, and was awarded the honorary rank of colonel (at the time of departure he had been a lieutenant-colonel).

After the war Bevan returned to his career in brokerage, and was later a chairman of Equitable Life Assurance Society but this was not the end of his career in deception – he attempted to revive inter-country deception strategy in 1947, and held a yearly dinner at Brooks's Club for his wartime friends. In 1948 Bevan was awarded the American Legion of Merit (Degree of Commander). The following year he was awarded a CB, which Tar Robertson (a member of the Twenty Committee) called "a fully fitting recompense".

Bevan died in London on 3 December 1978 from lung cancer.

== Legacy ==
Along with Dudley Clarke, Peter Fleming and Newton Smith, Bevan was one of the key figures in Allied deception strategy during the Second World War. In particular he pioneered the use of strategic deception on a scale never previously seen. However, because of the intense secrecy surrounding his work this contribution went largely unnoticed until the 1970s, when the release of previously restricted archives and publication of Sir John Masterman's The Double-Cross System in the War of 1939 to 1945 drew attention to Bevan's work.

Bevan was portrayed in the West End & Broadway musical Operation Mincemeat. In both productions, he was originally portrayed by Zoë Roberts.

== Personality ==
Dennis Wheatley described Bevan as "a rather frail-looking man of medium build with sleepy pale blue eyes and thin fair hair which turned gray from the strain of the remarkable work he accomplished". Bevan was an enthusiast for the outdoors and was an active sportsman.
