= R Force =

British military deception unit in WWII

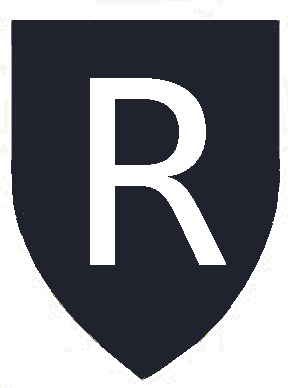
- R Force insignia. Engineers wore a blue background while signallers wore black.
- Active: 1944–1945
- Country: United Kingdom
- Engagements: Operation Fortitude; Allied Invasion of France; Allied Invasion of Germany

Commanders
- Notable commanders: David Strangeways

R Force was a British deception force during World War II that consisted of armoured vehicles, field engineers and a wireless unit. During Operation Fortitude it attempted to exaggerate the strength of Allied forces in Britain, and deceive German intelligence about Allied intentions. Later it performed a similar role during the fighting in Western Europe in 1944–45. It was commanded by Lieutenant Colonel David Strangeways.

== History ==
Lieutenant Colonel David Strangeways served in the North African Campaign with Brigadier Dudley Clarke's A Force, a special unit that used radio nets to give out false information, and decoy tanks and other vehicles to divert Axis forces away from the areas of Allied attack. Strangeways implemented a deception plan designed to fool the Axis powers as to the time and place of the Allied invasion of North Africa. Later in the campaign, using a combination of bluff, boldness and speed Strangeways was able to seize the German headquarters at Tunis before the enemy could destroy their secret documents.

In 1943, after General Sir Bernard Montgomery took command of 21st Army Group, he requested that Strangeways take charge of R-Force, another deception force organised along the lines of A Force for the Allied invasion of France. Strangeways chose the name R Force in the hope that if the Germans discovered it, they might assume that the R stood for reconnaissance. Indeed, it could operate as one, as it was equipped with three companies of light scout cars and a support company. These were equipped with special speakers so they could emulate the sounds of tanks in battle. R Force took over a number of Royal Engineers camouflage units. To their number was added personnel from "Turner's Department", a deception organisation led by Colonel John Turner, that been engaged in the construction of decoy airfields and other military sites. No. 5 Wireless Group was formed in January 1944 to provide R Force with a communications deception capability. Equipped with special radios and recording devices, it could simulate the radio traffic of a corps. R Force's strength eventually rose to over 1,200. Royal Signals personnel serving with the unit wore a sleeve patch with a white R on a black background, while Royal Engineers wore one with a blue background.

Strangeways devised and implemented the deception Operation Quicksilver, a significant part of Operation Fortitude, with the intent of fooling the Germans that the Allied invasion would take place in the Pas-de-Calais area. After the Allied landings in Normandy in June 1944, R Force moved to the continent where it operated under the 21st Army Group. It was one of the first units to enter Brussels and Rouen, and later conducted a deception campaign for the crossing of the Rhine River.

R Force's exploits were dramatised in the 2004 TV drama Fooling Hitler starring Jason Durr.
