= London Controlling Section =

British strategic deception unit during WW2

The London Controlling Section

The London Controlling Section (LCS) was a British secret department established in September 1941, under Oliver Stanley, with a mandate to coordinate Allied strategic military deception during World War II. The LCS was formed within the Joint Planning Staff at the offices of the War Cabinet, which was presided over by Winston Churchill as Prime Minister. (Note: The American counterpart of the LCS was the Joint Security Control, under the Joint Chiefs of Staff.)

At first the department struggled to have any impact, and Stanley spent time away from the office due to his wife's terminal illness. In June his post of Controlling Officer was handed over to Colonel John Bevan, who managed the LCS until the end of the war.

The organisation was publicly revealed by Sir Ronald Wingate in 1969.

== Early deception ==
Following the onset of the Second World War, the Allied nations began to recognise deception as a useful strategy. In early 1941 Lieutenant-Colonel Dudley Clarke's 'A' Force department, based in Cairo, undertook deception operations for the North African campaign. As their work came to the notice of high command Clarke was summoned to London, in late September 1941, to brief the army establishment.

The Joint Planning Staff of the War Office were impressed with Clarke's presentation and recommended to the Chiefs of Staff Committee that a similar department should be formed in London to oversee deception across all theatres of war. Clarke was offered the job of heading this new section, named the London Controlling Section. However, he declined, preferring to return to Cairo.

Instead, on 9 October, the post was offered to Colonel Oliver Stanley, a former Secretary of State for War. However, Clarke had left very little information about 'A' Force and his own deception activities, so Stanley had to fend for himself. His task was made more difficult by the fact that strategic deception was a wholly new concept in England, and had few champions in the military establishment. The LCS was granted representatives from all three of the services, and theoretically had a lot of power. In practice there was little interest in deception. The army sent Lieutenant Colonel Fritz Lumby, while the RAF, refusing to send any Group Captains due to the Battle of Britain, commissioned the author Dennis Wheatley as their representative. This lack of interest left the LCS, according to Wheatley, in a state of "near impotence". The climate was not right for strategic deception on the Western Front, very few offensive operations were being planned, and Stanley was not able to do much to raise the profile of the department. However, the LCS did manage to put together Operation Hardboiled, a fictional threat against Norway, although it eventually fizzled out.

The end of Hardboiled was very demotivating. To make matters worse, Stanley's wife was diagnosed with a terminal illness, and he took extensive sick leave to care for her. In May 1942, Lumley was offered a posting to Africa, which he eagerly accepted. On 21 May two important events occurred; Lieutenant-Colonel John Bevan was selected to replace Lumley at the LCS, and Churchill received a letter from Archibald Wavell, the commander who had started Clarke's deception career in Cairo, recommending a broader Allied deception strategy. The letter seems to have invigorated Churchill's interest in deception; when Bevan arrived at the department on 1 June he found himself promoted to Controlling Officer; Stanley's request to return to politics having been speedily granted in the interim.

== 1942 ==
Bevan was a driven individual with good connections in the establishment. He recognised the role that the London Controlling Section could play in Allied strategy and set to work making it happen. Bevan kept Wheatley, another socialite, on the staff, and the two complemented each other well. He also recruited Major Ronald Wingate.

The London Controlling Section was moved down into the Cabinet War Office, to be closer to the other key strategic war planning. This helped the new department be taken seriously.

== Charter ==
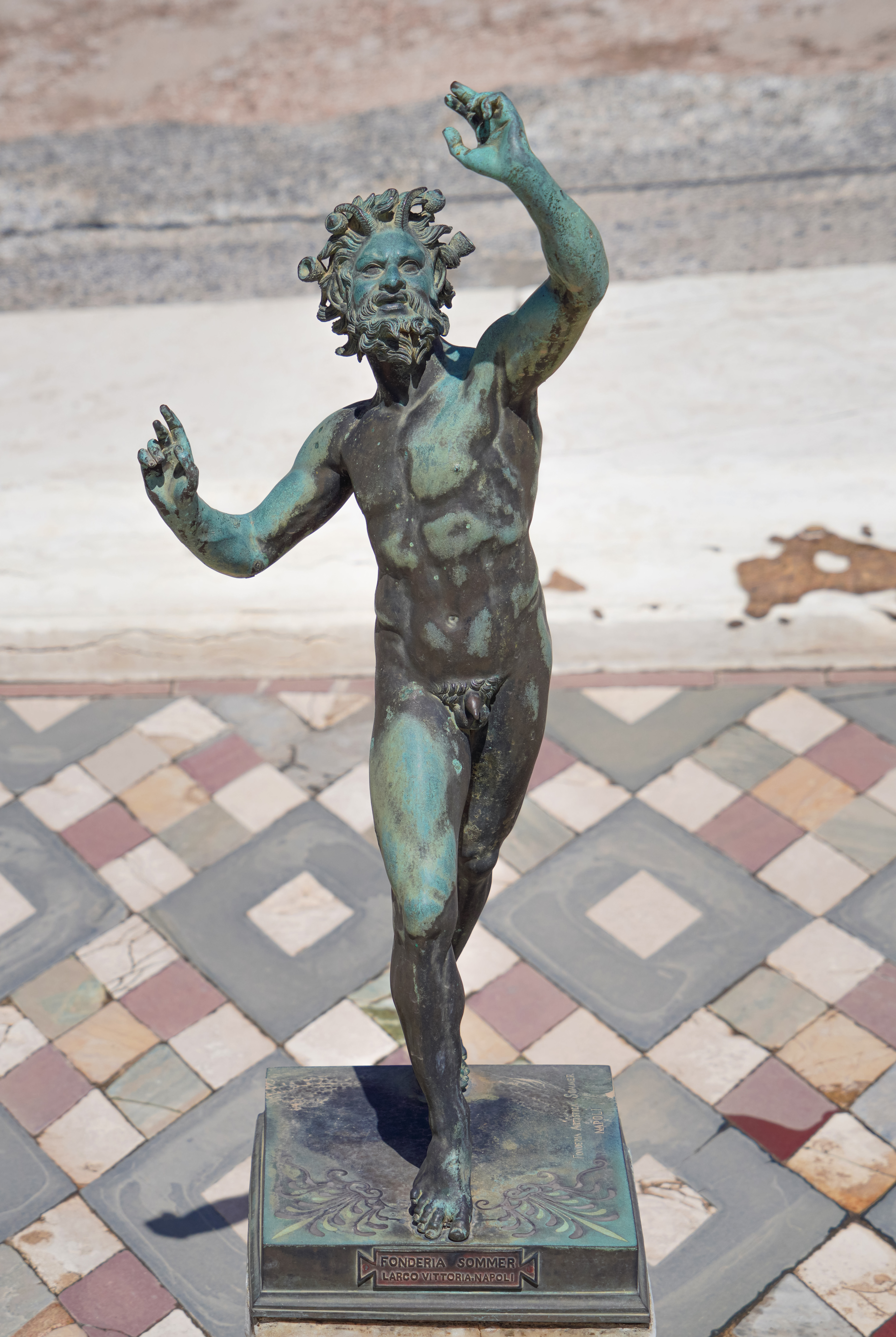
The LCS kept a replica of this dancing faun on its conference table in London, symbolic of the ruses de guerre that the organisation played.

The sweeping LCS charter, in part, authorised them to prepare cover and deception plans on a world-wide basis, co-ordinate deception plans prepared by Commands world-wide, and watch over the execution of deception plans. Additionally, and more sweeping, they were not limited to strategic deception, but had authority to include any matter for a military advantage.

Cover and deception are intended to either create or reinforce a belief in one's opponent which influences the opponents behavior along certain lines. Cover induces belief that something true is false. Deception induces belief that something false is true. "Cover conceals truth; deception conveys falsehood. Cover induces nonaction; deception induces action." Since behavior is that which is to be influenced, the enemy does not have to actually believe what is being projected. It is only necessary that the enemy is so concerned that he must provide for it.

To influence behavior, the target of deception is the enemy commander, and the consumer of the deception is the commander's intelligence organisation. For example, for strategic deception in Europe, the target of deception was Adolf Hitler himself through the Supreme Command of the Armed Forces, Oberkommando der Wehrmacht (OKW). The consumer was a branch of the intelligence staff of the High Command of the Army, Oberkommando des Heeres (OKH), the Foreign Armies West, Fremde Heere West (FHW).

Three essential elements of deception are a firm plan, adequate security, and time. For an operation to be successful, there must be a clear statement of the true situation along with the objective and a road map of how to bring a certain belief into the mind of the enemy. Clearly, there can be no deception if security fails and the enemy knows the true situation. Finally, the higher the target, the more time is required to build up the mosaic presented to the target.

John Bevan, the first Controlling Officer of the LCS, added two additional elements to strategic deception: codebreaking and double agents. Codebreaking in the European Theatre was done at Bletchley Park, and the intelligence from this activity was codenamed Ultra. Generally, the information was used to ferret out enemy intentions. However, in the arena of deception operations, the information was used to assess the effectiveness of the cover and deception operation. Double agents were in the purview of the Double-Cross System, run by the "Twenty Committee", under John Cecil Masterman. Double agents were used to collect intelligence of enemy interests through the questionnaires they received from their German Controllers. But more importantly they were used to inject deceptive information at a high level. In this respect, British intelligence was in a very strong position since it had broken the German agent codes at a very early stage and was soon after able to intercept and read exchanges between Abwehr headquarters and their outstations. This provided a third dimension that permitted the allies to know if and when their attempts at deception had been believed. By comparison, German intelligence had no similar avenue of feedback and were never able to know if their attempts at deception had been effective. This situation was reported in detail in Hugh Trevor-Roper's Radio Intelligence Report 28, 5 June 1944 (TNA HW 19/347).

== Personnel ==
Eventually, not including those who were attached, there were seven primary members of the LCS:

- Lieutenant-Colonel (later Colonel) John Bevan, MC (5 April 1894 – December 1978) Controlling Officer.
- Major (later Colonel) Ronald Evelyn Leslie Wingate, CIE (30 September 1889 – 31 August 1978) Deputy Controlling Officer
- Flight Lieutenant (later Wing Commander) Dennis Wheatley, RAFVR. (Note: Royal Air Force Volunteer Reserve) (8 January 1897 – 10 November 1977)
- Major (later Lieutenant-Colonel) Harold Peteval (1900–77)
- Commander James Gordon Arbuthnott, RN (1894–1985)
- Major Neil Gordon Clark (1898–1985)
- Major Derrick Morley

One American, Major (later Lieutenant Colonel) William H. Baumer (c.1909-1989), assigned to the US War Plans Division, was seconded to the LCS and served there for Operation Fortitude and subsequent operations.

As head of the LCS, John Bevan would clearly rank as one of the four preeminent deception planners in World War II along with Dudley Clarke, Peter Fleming, and Newman Smith. Along with Bevan's talents, he was aided by his friendships with General Lord Ismay, who acted as Military Deputy Secretary of the War Cabinet and was Chief of the Chiefs of Staff Committee within the War Cabinet, Sir Stewart Menzies, who was Chief of MI6, and Sir Alan Brooke, who was Chief of the Imperial General Staff - Bevan dined with him 2 or 3 times a month. Bevan also had direct contact with Churchill and indirect contact through Churchill's Chief of Staff, Ismay.

Wingate, the Deputy Controlling Officer, became a member of the LCS through the efforts of Ismay. Wingate and Ismay previously had lengthy associations with each other in service of the Crown in India.

The LCS had considerable clout with Churchill, as he had direct interest in deception, and through both Bevan and Wingate being friends with Ismay, Churchill's Chief of Staff. Lord Charles Wilson Moran, said Ismay was "the Pepys at Churchill's court, the 'perfect oil-can.'"

Dennis Wheatley, in his forties, was a well-known best-selling author. While initially a Flight Lieutenant, he engineered ideas and proposed them to high-ranking officers, with several of his imaginative suggestions being adopted, including the plan to deceive the Germans regarding the site of the D-day landings.

== Operations ==
The first major deception operation carried out by the London Controlling Section was the cover plans for Operation Torch (the Allied invasion of French North Africa on 8 November 1942). The deception plans that were masterminded for this operation were: Operation Overthrow, SOLO I, SOLO II, Operation Townsman and Operation Kennecott.

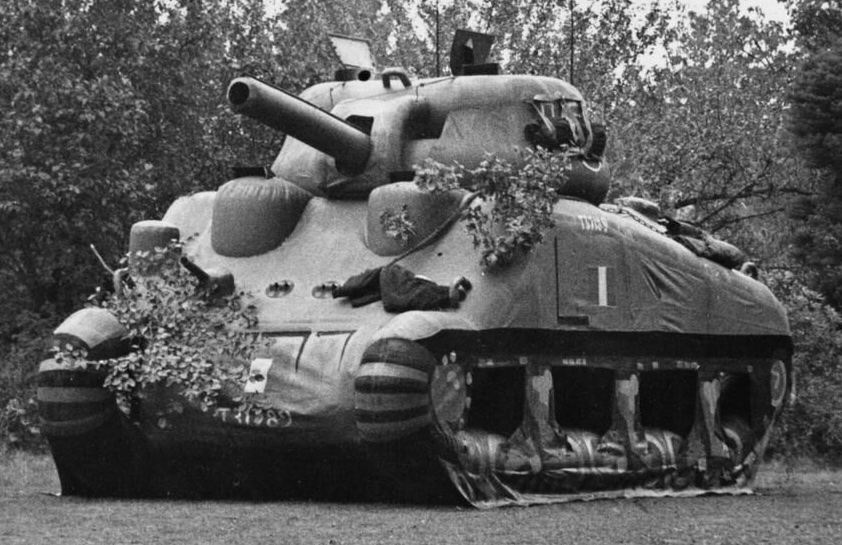
An inflatable dummy tank, modeled after the M4 Sherman and used as part of Operation Fortitude

The most significant operation with which LCS was associated was Operation Fortitude, the cover and deception for the Normandy invasion in 1944. The strategic plan for Allied deception in 1944, Operation Bodyguard, was drawn up by LCS, which set down the general story of Fortitude. Fortitude was however implemented by the "Ops (B)" section of SHAEF, under General Eisenhower. Ops (B) was composed of two sections, one dealing with physical deception and the other dealing with Special Means, (Note: Major Roger Fleetwood-Hesketh commanded the Special Means sub-sections of Ops (B), and, immediately after the conclusion of WW II, he wrote the official history of Operation FORTITUDE, which was eventually published in 2000.) that is, controlled leakage. Initially, the TWIST Committee of the LCS selected the channels for dissemination of controlled leakage. Ultimately, the TWIST committee was abolished and Ops (B) was allowed to deal directly with Section B1A of MI5, which managed controlled agents.

== Cold War ==
Bevan stepped down from the LCS after mid-1945. The LCS continued on into the Cold War period much changed in composition and size.
