= John S. Winn =

U.S. Army brigadier general (1863–1940)

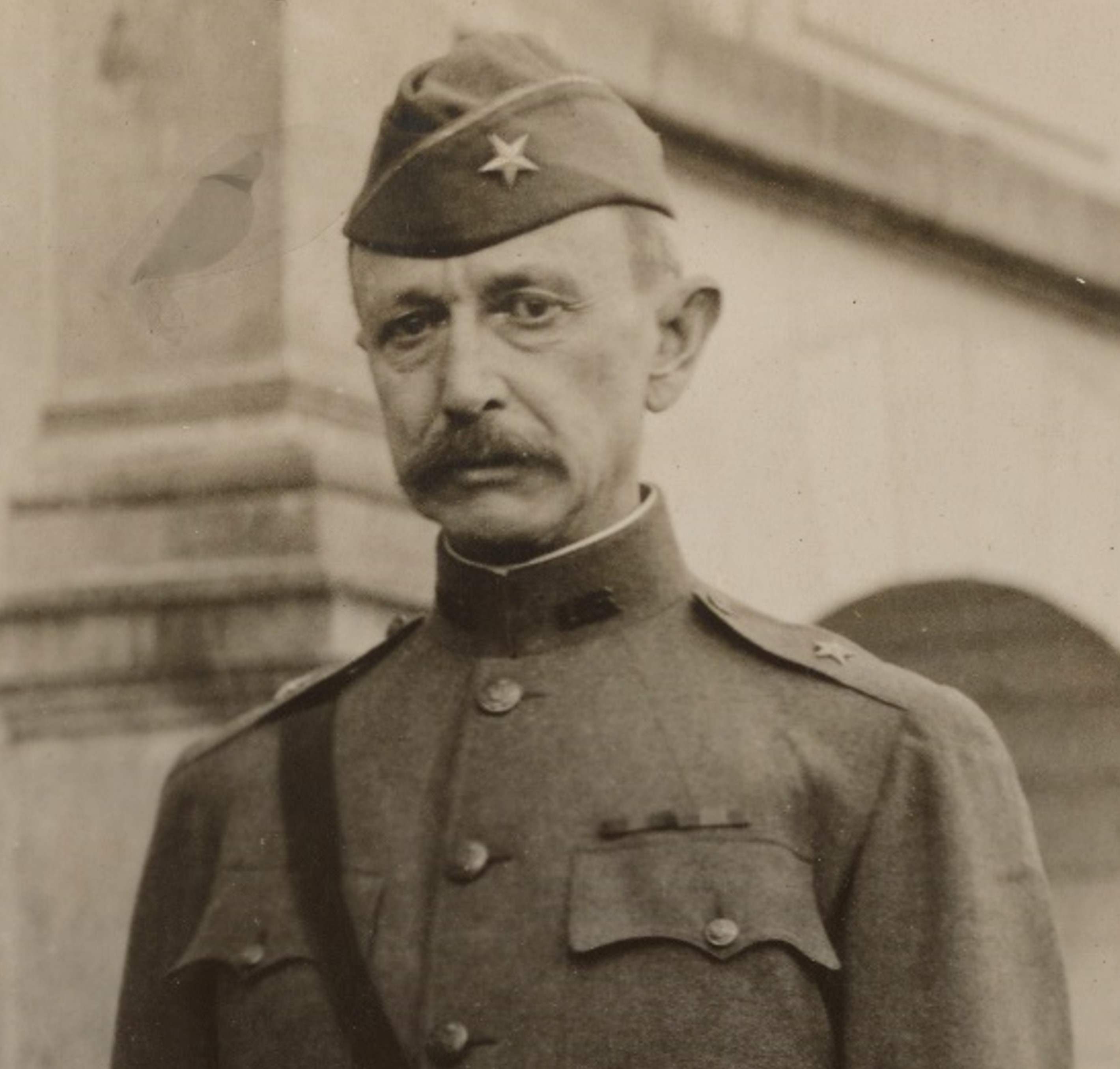
- Winn in France, January 1919. U.S. Army Signal Corps photo.
- Born: November 26, 1863; Winchester, Kentucky, U.S.
- Died: January 24, 1940 (aged 76); Berkeley, California, U.S.
- Burial place: West Point Cemetery
- Alma mater: United States Military Academy
- Spouse: Grace Stanley Legrow (m. 1890–1940)
- Children: 4
- Relatives: Frank L. Winn (first cousin)
- Military career
- Service: United States Army
- Service years: 1888–1922
- Rank: Brigadier General
- Service number: 0-205
- Unit: U.S. Army Cavalry Branch
- Commands: Troop D, 2nd Cavalry Regiment; 2nd Squadron, 2nd Cavalry Regiment; 7th Infantry Brigade; 73rd Infantry Brigade; 157th Infantry Brigade; 79th Division; 2nd Cavalry Regiment
- Wars: Spanish–American War; Philippine–American War; United States occupation of Veracruz; Pancho Villa Expedition; World War I Occupation of the Rhineland
- Awards: Silver Star; Legion of Honor (Officer) (France)

John S. Winn (November 26, 1863 – January 24, 1940), was a career officer in the United States Army. A veteran of the Spanish–American War, Philippine–American War, United States occupation of Veracruz, Pancho Villa Expedition, World War I, and the Occupation of the Rhineland, and he attained the rank of brigadier general. Winn commanded brigades in France during the First World War, and was a recipient of the Silver Star and the French Legion of Honor (Officer).

A native of Winchester, Kentucky, he graduated from the United States Military Academy at West Point in 1888 and was commissioned in the Cavalry Branch. During his early career, Winn performed frontier duty in the northwestern United States. From 1892 to 1896, he instructed mathematics as a member of the West Point faculty. He served in Cuba during the Spanish–American War, and the Philippines during the Philippine–American War.

Winn went on to serve in Mexico during the United States occupation of Veracruz and on the Texas–Mexico border during the Pancho Villa Expedition. During World War I, Winn was promoted to temporary brigadier general, and his commands included the 7th Infantry Brigade, a unit of the 4th Division, the 73rd Infantry Brigade, a unit of the 37th Division, and the 157th Infantry Brigade, a unit of the 79th Division. Winn's wartime heroism was recognized with award of the Silver Star and the French Legion of Honor (Officer).

After the war, Winn returned to his permanent rank of colonel and commanded the 2nd Cavalry Regiment until retiring in 1922. In retirement, he resided in Berkeley, California. In 1930, the U.S. Congress enacted legislation permitting First World War general officers to retire at their highest rank, and he was promoted to brigadier general on the retired list. Winn died in Berkeley on January 24, 1940, and was buried at West Point Cemetery.

== Early life ==
John Sheridan Winn was born in Winchester, Kentucky on November 26, 1863, a son of Joshua Nicholas Winn (1821–1901) and Ellen (Poston) Winn (1832–1893). Among his relatives was first cousin Frank L. Winn, who was also a career army officer and retired as a major general. (Note: Frank's father William (1819–1898) and John's father were brothers, and Frank and John were both grandsons of Phillip Bird Winn (1786–1870) and Martha Fry (Nicholas) Winn (1794–1868).) He was raised and educated in Winchester, and attended Transylvania University for three years. In 1884, he began attending the United States Military Academy at West Point. He graduated in 1888 ranked ninth of 44; he held leadership positions in all four of his West Point years, and in his senior year he served as first captain, the highest-ranking member of the corps of cadets.

Winn's classmates included several individuals who later attained the rank of brigadier general or higher in their military careers, including Henry Jervey, Charles H. McKinstry, William V. Judson, George W. Burr, John L. Hayden, William S. Peirce, Peyton C. March, James W. McAndrew, Charles A. Hedekin. John D. L. Hartman, Robert L. Howze, Guy H. Preston, Edward Anderson, Peter C. Harris, William R. Dashiell, and Eli A. Helmick. After graduating, he received his commission as a second lieutenant of Cavalry.

== Start of career ==
Upon receiving his commission, Winn was assigned to the 2nd Cavalry Regiment and posted to Fort Walla Walla, Washington. In June 1890, he was reassigned to frontier duty at Fort Huachuca and Fort Bowie, Arizona Territory. From August 1892 to August 1896, Winn served on the West Point faculty as an instructor of mathematics, and he was promoted to first lieutenant in June 1895.

From August 1896 to April 1898, Winn served with the 2nd Cavalry at Fort Logan, Colorado. During the Spanish–American War, he served with the 2nd Cavalry at Camp George H. Thomas, Georgia from April to May 1898. From May to July, he served on a panel that was responsible for acquiring horses to be used by the army during the war. He then rejoined the 2nd Cavalry at Huntsville, Alabama, where he remained until February 1899. In March 1899, Winn was with the 2nd Cavalry when it began service at Cienfuegos, Cuba, and he remained with the regiment when it moved to Matanzas. He was promoted to captain in February 1901.

In April 1902, Winn was reassigned to Fort Ethan Allen, Vermont as commander of Troop D, 2nd Cavalry Regiment. In December 1903, he was assigned to the Philippines during the Philippine–American War. He remained there until January 1906, when he was posted to Fort Assinniboine, Montana. In April 1907, Winn was detailed to quartermaster duty and assigned to oversee construction at Boise Barracks, Idaho.

== Continued career ==
In December 1908, Winn was posted as assistant to the chief quartermaster at the headquarters of the army's Central Department, which was based in Chicago. He was relieved from his quartermaster detail in April 1911 and assigned to the 9th Cavalry Regiment. He was assigned to the 4th Cavalry Regiment and promoted to major in July 1911, and in August he was transferred back to the 2nd Cavalry.

Winn served in the Philippines for the second time from August 1911 to May 1912. He served with his regiment at Fort Bliss, Texas from May to October 1912. From October to December 1912, Winn was a student at the Mounted Service School at Fort Riley, Kansas. From December 1912 to December 1913, he served at Fort Bliss and on the Texas-Mexico border. From December 1913 to August 1914, Winn was again posted to Fort Ethan Allen, Vermont, this time as commander of 2nd Squadron, 2nd Cavalry Regiment. In September 1914, he was detailed to inspector general duties and assigned to the expeditionary force that took part in the United States occupation of Veracruz.

In November 1914, Winn was assigned as inspector general of the 2nd Infantry Division in Texas City, Texas. From October 1915 to October 1917, he served as inspector general of the army's Southern Department, an assignment that required him to conduct observation and review of units taking part in the Pancho Villa Expedition. Winn was promoted to lieutenant colonel in July 1916 and colonel in May 1917.

== Later career ==
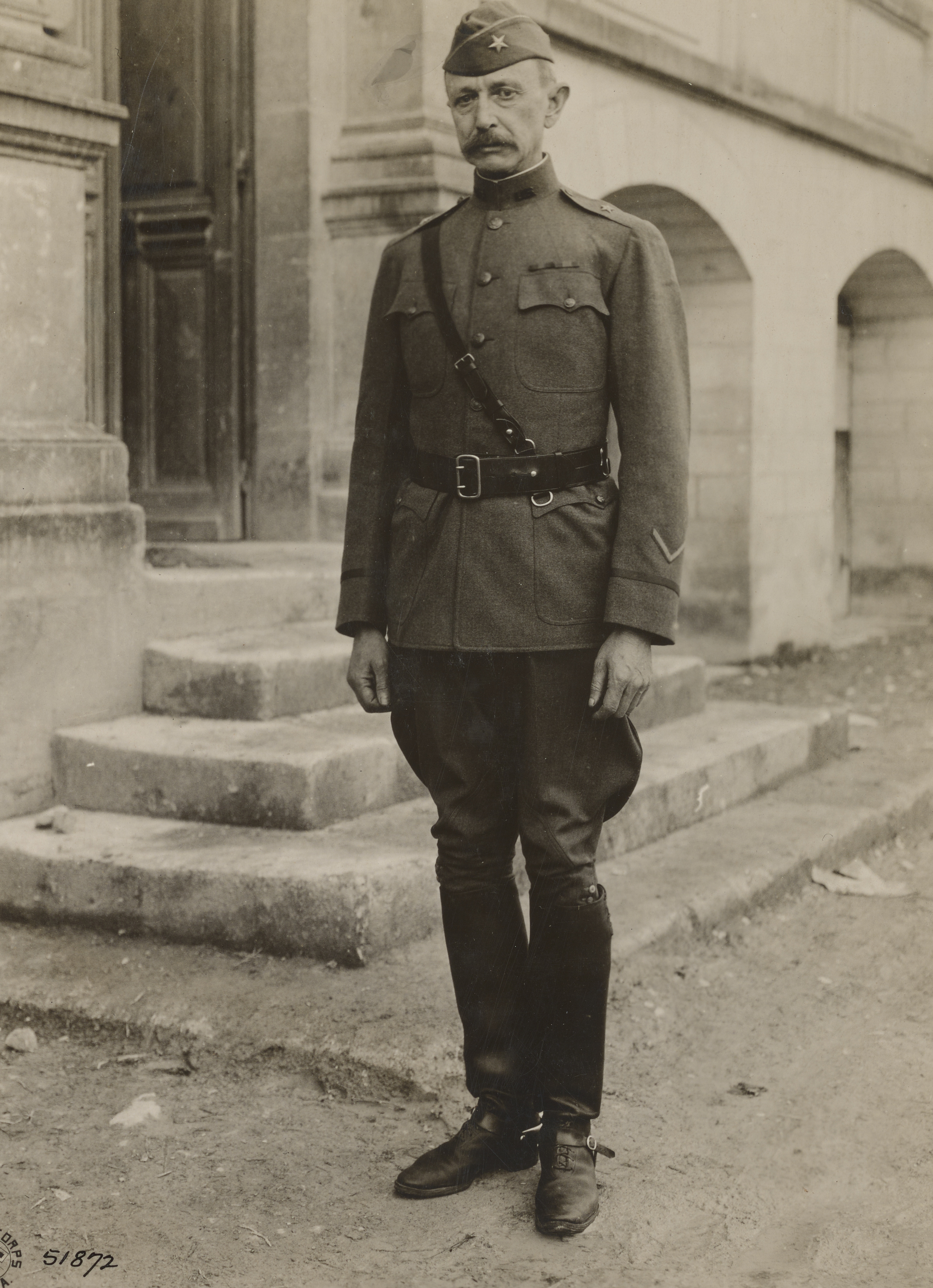
Brigadier General Winn in France, January 1919

With the army expanding for World War I, in October 1917, Winn was assigned to Camp Dix, New Jersey as the post's inspector general. In December 1917, he was promoted to the temporary rank of brigadier general. In January 1918, Winn sailed for France after he was assigned as inspector general for the Services of Supply (SOS) of the American Expeditionary Forces (AEF). He served in this position until September, when he joined the 3rd Division at the start of the Battle of Saint-Mihiel. Later that month, he was transferred to the 4th Division as commander of its 7th Infantry Brigade, which he led during the Meuse–Argonne offensive. In early October, Winn assumed command of the 73rd Infantry Brigade, one of two infantry brigades of the 37th Division. He was hospitalized for illness from mid-October until November 15, four days after the Armistice with Germany which ended the war, when he took command of the 157th Infantry Brigade, part of the 79th Division. In addition to commanding this brigade, Winn acted as division commander on several occasions.

After completing his occupation of the Rhineland duty in May 1919, Winn was assigned to the Cavalry Efficiency Board, which made recommendations on the Cavalry Branch's post-war staffing, equipping, and training. In October, he returned to his permanent grade of colonel, his brigadier general's rank only being for the duration of the war. In December, he was assigned as commander of the 2nd Cavalry Regiment at Fort Riley.

He retired from the army, after well over 30 years of service, in July 1922, and resided in Berkeley, California. In 1930, the U.S. Congress enacted a law permitting the general officers of World War I to retire at their highest rank, and Winn was promoted to brigadier general on the retired list.

Winn died at the age of 76 inn Berkeley on January 24, 1940. He was buried at West Point Cemetery.

== Awards ==
Winn's First World War service was recognized with award of the Silver Star and the French Legion of Honor (Officer).

=== Silver Star citation ===
By direction of the President, under the provisions of the act of Congress approved July 9, 1918 (Bul. No. 43, W.D., 1918), Brigadier General John Sheridan Winn, United States Army, is cited by the Commanding General, American Expeditionary Forces, for gallantry in action and a silver star may be placed upon the ribbon of the Victory Medals awarded him. Brigadier General Winn distinguished himself by gallantry in action while serving with the 157th Infantry Brigade, American Expeditionary Forces, in action near Septsarges, France, 27 September 1918, in personally rallying scattered groups of men under heavy shell and machine gun fire.

General Orders: General Headquarters, American Expeditionary Forces, Citation Orders No. 5 (June 3, 1919)

== Family ==
In October 1890, Winn married Grace Stanley LeGrow, whose sister Susan was the wife of Brigadier General Robert D. Walsh. They were the parents of four children. Helen Sturgis was the wife of Colonel Francis Robert Hunter. Katherine was the wife of Colonel Douglas Wiltz McEnery. John S. Winn Jr. was a career army officer and retired as a brigadier general. Stanley LeGrow Winn died at age 16.
