= Guy H. Preston =

US Army brigadier general (1864–1952)

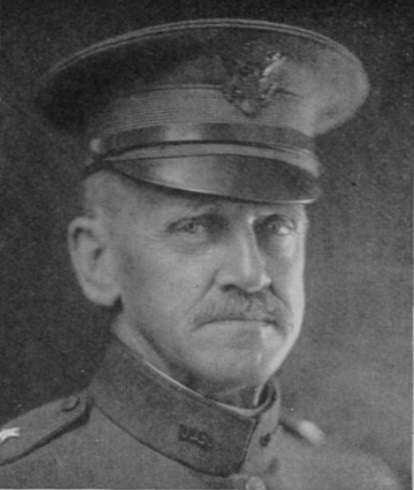
- Preston circa 1918. From the April 1954 issue of Assembly magazine
- Born: May 29, 1864; Medford, Massachusetts, US
- Died: December 12, 1952 (aged 88); Palo Alto, California, US
- Burial place: Alta Mesa Memorial Park, Palo Alto, California, US
- Education: United States Military Academy; United States Army Command and General Staff College; United States Army War College
- Spouse: Frances Elizabeth Hacker (m. 1899–1930)
- Children: 2
- Military career
- Service: United States Army
- Service years: 1888–1928
- Rank: Brigadier General
- Service number: 0-208
- Unit: US Army Cavalry Branch
- Commands: Troop F, 13th Cavalry Regiment; 2nd Squadron, 4th Cavalry Regiment; 19th Cavalry Regiment; 77th Field Artillery Regiment; 4th Field Artillery Brigade; 160th Field Artillery Brigade; 7th Division; Camp Harry J. Jones; 1st Cavalry Regiment; 2nd Division Trains; 23rd Infantry Regiment; Eighth Corps Area General Depot; General Intermediate Depot, San Francisco
- Conflicts: American Indian Wars: Ghost Dance War; Battle of Wounded Knee; Drexel Mission Fight; Bannock War of 1895; Johnson County War; Pullman Strike; Spanish–American War: Puerto Rico campaign; Philippine–American War; Mexican Border War; World War I Occupation of the Rhineland
- Awards: Silver Star

Guy H. Preston (May 29, 1864 – December 12, 1952) was a career officer in the United States Army. A veteran of the American Indian Wars, Spanish–American War, Philippine–American War, and World War I, he served from 1888 to 1928 and attained the rank of brigadier general. His command assignments included the 4th Field Artillery Brigade, 160th Field Artillery Brigade, 7th Division, 1st Cavalry Regiment, 23rd Infantry Regiment, Eighth Corps Area General Depot, and the San Francisco General Intermediate Depot. Preston's awards included the Citation Star for heroism in the Ghost Dance War against the Lakota people in 1891. When the Citation Star was authorized for conversion to the Silver Star in 1932, Preston's award was converted to the new medal.

A native of Medford, Massachusetts, Preston was raised and educated in Medford, Lanesboro, and Cheshire, and he attended Worcester Academy in Massachusetts and New Hampshire's Phillips Exeter Academy. He graduated from the United States Military Academy (West Point) in 1888 and began his military career in the Cavalry Branch. Near the end of the American Indian Wars, Preston took part in the Ghost Dance War and Bannock War of 1895. He served in Puerto Rico during the Spanish–American War and on the island of Luzon during the Philippine–American War.

During World War I, U.S. Army planners determined there was no need for Cavalry units in France, so they were converted to Field Artillery. Preston successively commanded the 19th Cavalry Regiment, 77th Field Artillery Regiment, 4th Field Artillery Brigade, and 160th Field Artillery Brigade, in addition to serving as interim commander of the 7th Division. During the war he was promoted to temporary brigadier general. After the war, he returned to his permanent rank of colonel and commanded the 23rd Infantry Regiment, Eighth Corps Area General Depot, and General Intermediate Depot, San Francisco.

Preston retired in 1928 and became a resident of Palo Alto, California. He died in Palo Alto on December 12, 1952. He was buried at Alta Mesa Memorial Park in Pao Alto.

== Early life ==
Guy Henry Preston was born in Medford, Massachusetts on May 29, 1864, the son of Reverend George M. Preston and Aurelia B. (Leadbetter) Preston. He was raised and educated in Medford, Lanesboro, and Cheshire, and attended Worcester Academy and Phillips Exeter Academy.

In 1883, Preston was a candidate for an appointment to the United States Military Academy. He placed first of nine candidates on the competitive examination offered by US representative George D. Robinson, and entered the academy in 1884. He graduated in 1888 ranked 25th of 44 and received his commission as a second lieutenant of Cavalry.

Among Preston's classmates who also attained general officer rank were Henry Jervey, Charles Hedges McKinstry, William V. Judson, George Washington Burr, John Louis Hayden, William S. Peirce, John S. Winn, Peyton C. March, James W. McAndrew, Charles Aloysius Hedekin, John Daniel Leinbach Hartman, Robert Lee Howze, Edward Anderson, Peter Charles Harris, William Robert Dashiell, and Eli Alva Helmick. Preston's initial assignment was as an additional second lieutenant with the 1st Cavalry Regiment, but he was almost immediately assigned to the 9th Cavalry Regiment and posted to Fort Robinson, Nebraska.

== Start of career ==
Preston remained with the 9th Cavalry at Fort Robinson until October 1890, when he performed temporary detached service at Fort Myer, Virginia. From December 1890 to March 1891, he took part in the Ghost Dance War against the Lakota people, including the Battle of Wounded Knee and the Drexel Mission Fight. From March to August 1891, Preston was in charge of Native American prisoners captured during the fighting, after which he returned to the 9th Cavalry at Fort Robinson.

In 1892, Preston was part of the 9th Cavalry contingent dispatched to Wyoming to quell conflicts that took place as part of the Johnson County War. From January 1893 to January 1894, he was on duty in Chicago during the World's Columbian Exposition. After this assignment, Preston returned to service with the 9th Cavalry, and he remained with them until December 1896. In February 1896, he was promoted to first lieutenant by making use of a vacant position in the 4th Cavalry Regiment, and he was transferred back to the 9th Cavalry in March.

When the army was called out to prevent union members from blocking trains during the 1894 Pullman Strike, Preston was among the troops who were directed to restore order. He was among the 9th Cavalry soldiers who took part in the Bannock War of 1895, and performed temporary duty in Wyoming while prepared to respond if the conflict escalated into open warfare. From December 1896 to February 1897, Preston performed temporary staff duty at the Department of War in Washington, D.C. From February to August 1897, he was the 9th Cavalry's adjutant. While assigned as adjutant, he attended the School of Application for Infantry and Cavalry (now the United States Army Command and General Staff College), from which he graduated in 1897. He requested reassignment from the adjutant's post in September 1897, and performed duty with the Department of the Columbia until February 1898. Preston was in charge of pack trains organized to take part in the 1898 Yukon Relief Mission, which was organized to provide food and other supplies to gold miners stranded in a remote area of Alaska.

In February 1898, Preston sailed to Alaska with the pack trains that he had organized. After completing the relief mission, he spent several months with an army contingent that explored Prince William Sound. In July 1898, he sailed from Alaska to Puerto Rico for Spanish–American War duty, and was in charge of army pack trains that supplied soldiers in the field. In September 1898, he was again assigned to duty at the War Department.

== Continued career ==
From July to October 1899, Preston served as aide-de-camp to Major General Nelson A. Miles, the Commanding General of the United States Army. In August 1899 he was promoted to temporary major in the 41st U.S. Infantry, a unit of United States Volunteers raised for service in the Philippines. From October 1899 to July 1900, he took part in organizing and training the regiment, which then departed the U.S. for overseas duty during the Philippine–American War. Upon arrival in the Philippines, Preston was assigned as provost judge for the province of Pampanga, a post he held until March 1901.

In February 1901, he received promotion to captain in the regular army. He was then appointed inspector general for the 3rd District of the Department of Northern Luzon, where he served until August 1901. In June 1901, he was discharged from the Volunteers and reverted to his permanent rank of captain. Preston became ill in August 1901, and was hospitalized in the Philippines until the following November, when he returned to the United States to convalesce. He returned to duty with the 13th Cavalry Regiment in July 1902. In June 1903, Preston returned to the Philippines to take part in occupation duty with the 9th Cavalry, and he remained there until May 1905.

Preston served with the 13th Cavalry at Fort Myer from May 1905 to March 1909, including commanding the regiment's Troop F. In February and March 1907, he performed temporary duty at the Springfield Armory in Massachusetts, where he was a member of the Automatic Pistol Board that considered specifications and designs for the procurement and fielding of a new army service pistol. From March 1909 to March 1911, he served with the 13th Cavalry at Fort Riley, Kansas. From March 1911 to October 1912, he performed Mexican Border War duty in Arizona and New Mexico, first with the 13th Cavalry, and later with the 8th Cavalry Regiment. In February 1912, he was promoted to major in the 4th Cavalry Regiment.

== Later career ==
From October to December 1912, Preston was a student at Fort Riley's Riding School for Cavalry officers. He served in Hawaii with the 4th Cavalry from March 1913 to March 1916, including command of its 2nd Squadron, and he graduated from the United States Army War College in 1914. He was then posted to Fort Ethan Allen, Vermont, where he served with the 2nd Cavalry Regiment. He was promoted to lieutenant colonel in July 1916. With the army expanding in anticipation of US participation in World War I, Preston served at Camp Shelby, Mississippi and Camp Greene, North Carolina, where he commanded the 19th Cavalry Regiment. When army planners determined there was no need for Cavalry units to serve in France, they were reorganized as Field Artillery, and Preston led his regiment's reorganization and fielding as the 77th Field Artillery Regiment. In January 1918, he served as the first commander of the 7th Division during its initial organization and training, and he served as interim commander of the division again in January 1919.

In April 1918, Preston was promoted to temporary brigadier general and in May he was assigned to command the 4th Field Artillery Brigade, which he organized and trained at Camp Greene. He was then assigned to command the 160th Field Artillery Brigade at Camp Custer, Michigan. Preston led his brigade to France, where it took part in combat from August 1918 until the Armistice of November 11, 1918 ended the war. He remained in Europe as part of the Occupation of the Rhineland, including duty as provost marshal. He returned to the United States in July 1919 and reverted to his permanent rank of colonel.

In August 1919, Preston was assigned command of Camp Harry J. Jones, Arizona. In December he also assumed command of the 1st Cavalry Regiment, and he remained in these posts until September 1920. He was then assigned to Camp Travis, Texas, where he commanded the 2nd Division Trains and the 23rd Infantry Regiment. In March 1921, he was assigned to command the Eighth Corps Area General Depot in El Paso, Texas. In December 1922, he was assigned to Fort Mason, California, where he commanded the San Francisco General Intermediate Depot. Preston remained in this post until May 1928, when he reached the mandatory retirement age of 64 and left the army. He retired at the rank of colonel; in 1930, the U.S. Congress enacted legislation permitting World War I general officers to retire at their highest rank, and Preston was promoted to brigadier general on the retired list.

== Retirement and death ==
In retirement, Preston was a resident of Palo Alto, California. He died in Palo Alto on December 12, 1952. Preston was buried at Alta Mesa Memorial Park in Palo Alto.

== Family ==
In November 1899, Preston married Frances Elizabeth Hacker. She was a nurse by training, and they met at Garfield Hospital in Washington, D.C. when Preston was treated for Typhoid fever after his Spanish–American War service. She died in 1930, and he did not remarry. Preston was the father of two children, son John Beverly, an army aviator, and daughter Helen Howard, the wife of Major General Ray T. Maddocks.

== Awards ==
=== Awards ===
Preston received the Citation Star for heroism at the December 1890 Battle of Wounded Knee. When Citation Stars were approved for conversion to the Silver Star in 1932, Preston's Citation Star was included.

Citation:

"2nd Lieut. Guy H. Preston, 9th Cavalry, for courage and endurance in carrying a dispatch from Wounded Knee battle field to Pine Ridge, S.D. Dec. 29, 1890. Lieut. Preston left the field on this duty before the battle was entirely finished, and at a time when it was more than probable that he would encounter hostile Indians before reaching Pine Ridge. He made the ride of fifteen miles in one hour. The soldier who accompanied him fell from his horse from exhaustion."

== Legacy ==
=== Preston Branding ===
One of Preston's lasting contributions to army operations was the Preston Branding System, which he created in 1925 so the army could keep track of its inventory of horses and mules. Under Preston's system, the numbers could be used twice, once to identify horses and once to identify mules. The system was later applied to military working dogs, so each brand could be used three times. On the day of purchase, each animal was branded on the left side of the neck in characters two and one half inches high and one and one half inches wide. A quartermaster record was then created to keep track of each horse, mule, or dog.

Preston branding used a four character digit and letter system, beginning with A000, and proceeding to A001, A002, etc. Upon reaching A999, the sequence became 0A00 to 9A99, then 00A0 to 99A9. The next series would be B000 to B999, and the sequences could be repeated. To prevent confusion between letters and digits, G, I, O, and Q were not used. In addition, sets of branding numbers were assigned to each remount depot, which enabled the army to track the original purchase of each horse or mule. Because each four character sequence consisted of 1,000 possible brands, the Preston system provided more than enough brands to keep an accurate inventory of all the army's animals, and it remained in effect until after World War II, when continued mechanization of the army ended the need to track animals. Preston's branding system proved so useful that many states adopted it when they began to require registration plates for cars and trucks.

=== Preston mess kit ===
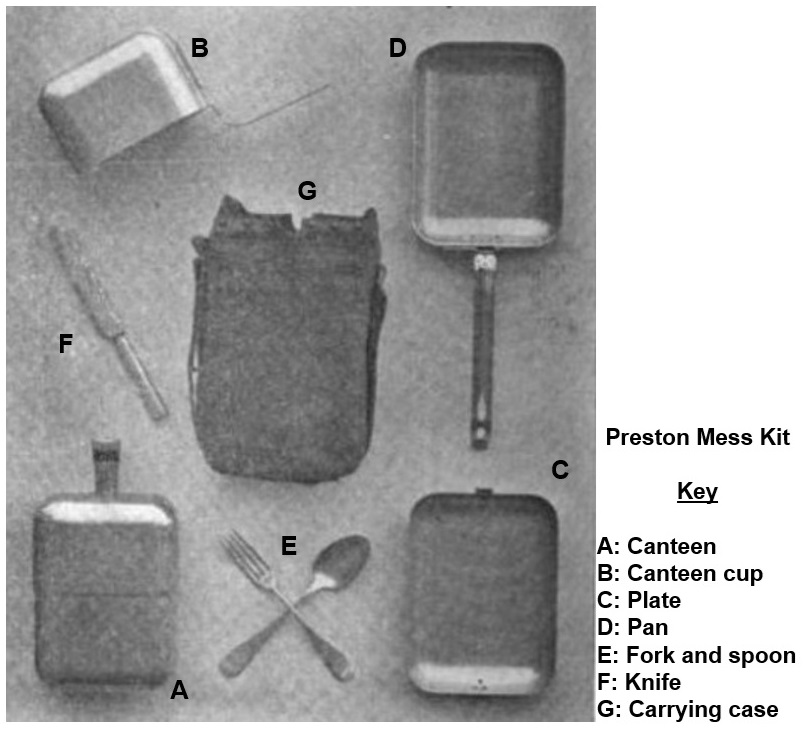
1900 photo of Preston mess kit

Preston's other lasting contribution was his 1895 invention of the Preston Mess Kit. The kit included two mess pans or plates that fit together in clamshell pattern, eating utensils, and canteen. It was compact and lightweight enough to be carried over the shoulder in a small leather or canvas case. The Preston Mess Kit proved popular with civilian campers, and a version of it was later retailed by Abercrombie & Fitch. Preston's mess kit remained in army use until after World War II, and subsequent kits retained the elements of Preston's design.

== Effective dates of promotion ==
- Additional Second Lieutenant, June 11, 1888
- Second Lieutenant, July 16, 1888
- First Lieutenant, February 25, 1896
- Major (United States Volunteers), August 17, 1899 (terminated June 30, 1901)
- Captain, February 2, 1901
- Major, February 20, 1912
- Lieutenant Colonel, July 1, 1916
- Colonel, May 15, 1917
- Brigadier General (National Army), May 15, 1917
- Colonel, July 15, 1919
- Colonel (Retired), May 29, 1928
- Brigadier General (Retired list), June 21, 1930
