= Charles Hedges McKinstry =

United States Army general

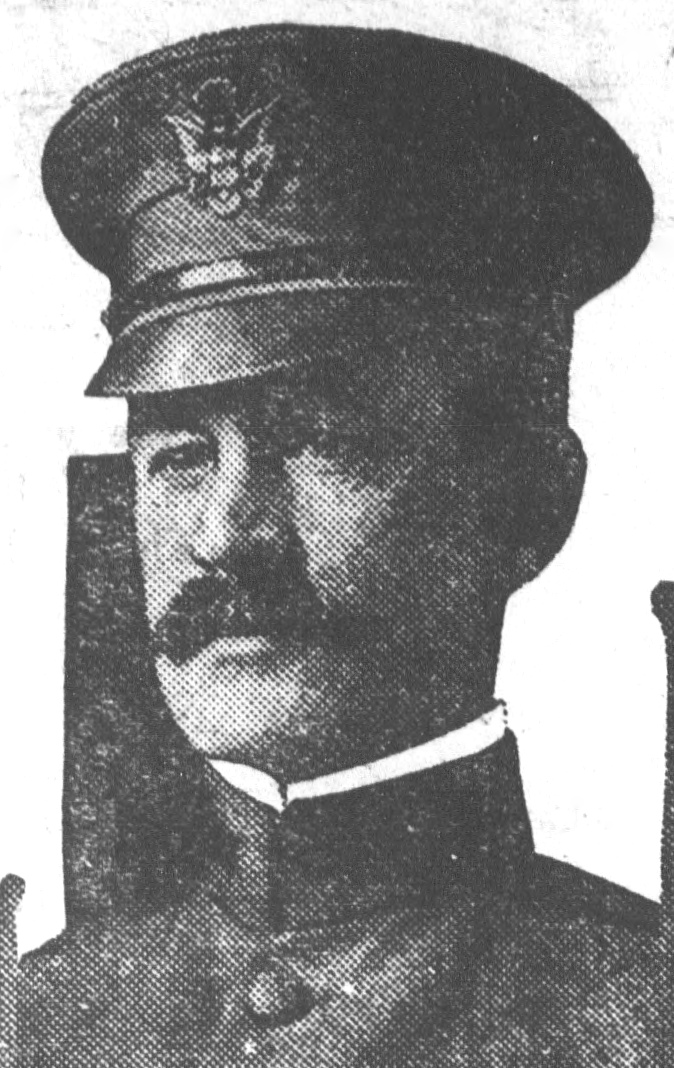
- Born: December 19, 1866; San Francisco, California, United States
- Died: November 29, 1961 (aged 94); Santa Barbara, California, United States
- Spouse: Lillie Lawrence McKinstry
- Military career
- Allegiance: United States
- Branch: United States Army
- Service years: 1888–1919
- Rank: Brigadier general
- Service number: 0-13388
- Unit: Corps of Engineers
- Conflicts: World War I

Charles Hedges McKinstry (December 19, 1866 – November 29, 1961) was an engineer and army officer for the United States Military.

== Early life and education ==
McKinstry was born on December 19, 1866, in San Francisco, California. He attended the United States Military Academy and graduated in 1888, number two of forty-four in his class. Among his classmates there were several men who would, like McKinstry himself, eventually attain the rank of general officer, such as James W. McAndrew, William Robert Dashiell, Robert Lee Howze, Peter Charles Harris, Eli Alva Helmick, Peyton C. March, Guy H. Preston, Henry Jervey, William Voorhees Judson, John Louis Hayden, Edward Anderson, William H. Hart, Charles Aloysius Hedekin and William S. Peirce.

== Military career ==
McKinstry was an instructor of engineering in West Point for the Corps of Engineers at the Engineering School of Application from 1891 to 1893. On June 11, 1888, McKinstry made second lieutenant and on July 22, 1888, he was promoted to first lieutenant. On October 11, 1892, McKinstry became a captain. Then on July 5, 1898, he became a major. After becoming a major, McKinstry went on to be in charge of defensive works and harbors improvements in Key West from 1898 to 1900. From 1901 to 1903, he was at the Engineer School in Willets Point, New York, as an instructor, which included instruction in astronomy. McKinstry moved on to Southern California during 1903–1906 to work on fortifications, rivers and harbors. On January 1, 1906, he became a lieutenant colonel. In 1909, McKinstry became chief engineer in the Philippine Island Division until 1911. On February 27, 1912, he was promoted to brigadier general and then became commander of the 158th Field Artillery Brigade on August 5, 1917. In 1919, McKinstry retired as a colonel.

== Personal life ==
On January 10, 1920, Lillie Lawrence McKinstry, his wife, died in Miami, Florida. McKinstry regained his rank of brigadier general in June 1930. On November 29, 1961, McKinstry died in Santa Barbara, California, at the age of 94.
