= Charles Aloysius Hedekin =

United States Army officer (1865–1944)

Charles Hedekin
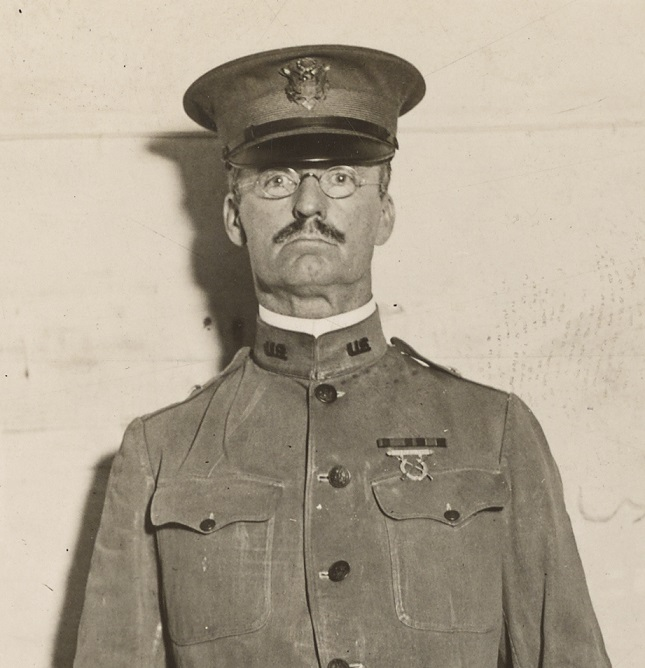
- Brig. Gen. Charles Hedekin in September 1918
- Born: December 9, 1865; Fort Wayne, Indiana
- Died: January 30, 1944 (aged 78); Washington, D.C.
- Spouse: Adelaide Drew
- Children: 2
- Military career
- Allegiance: United States
- Branch: United States Army
- Service years: 1888–1920
- Rank: Brigadier general
- Service number: 0-13487
- Unit: Cavalry Branch

Charles Aloysius Hedekin (December 9, 1865 – January 30, 1944) was a United States Army Cavalry officer in the late 19th and early 20th centuries. He served in numerous locations and incidents.

== Military career ==
Hedekin was born on December 9, 1865, in Fort Wayne, Indiana. He graduated 14th in a class of 44 from the United States Military Academy (USMA) at West Point, New York, in 1888. Among his classmates there were several men who would, like March himself, eventually attain the rank of general officer, such as James W. McAndrew, William M. Morrow, William Robert Dashiell, Robert Lee Howze, Peter Charles Harris, Eli Alva Helmick, Charles Hedges McKinstry, Henry Jervey, William Voorhees Judson, John Louis Hayden, Edward Anderson, William H. Hart, Peyton C. March and William S. Peirce.

Hedekin was commissioned into the 3rd Cavalry Regiment. He did frontier duty from his commissioning in 1888 to 1895. He went on detached service with the Intercontinental Railway Commission from March 1891 to May 1892, something which took him through Central America. Hedekin served along the border with Mexico during the Garza Revolution. After serving at the Jefferson Barracks Military Post for three years, he was stationed at Fort Ethan Allen, Fort Sheridan, and Fort Myer. Hedekin was sent to the Philippines, serving there for two years and returning in 1902. He then was sent to Fort Apache, Arizona. He served again in the Philippines from 1906 to 1908 at Fort Stotsenburg. After returning, Hedekin's regiment was stationed at Fort Sam Houston and Fort Clark, Texas.

On his promotion to the rank of major on September 3, 1911, Hedekin was transferred to the 15th Cavalry Regiment, commanding the Second Squadron. He completed a special field officers course at Fort Leavenworth, and then he graduated from the Mounted Service School at Fort Riley. He then graduated from the United States Army War College in 1912. Hedekin was stationed with the Militia Division of the United States Department of War, and he rescued stranded American tourists in Europe from August to October 1914. He went with the 4th Cavalry Regiment to the Schofield Barracks in 1916, and he assumed command of the 13th Cavalry Regiment in Fort Riley in July 1917, three months after the American entry into World War I. Hedekin took the regiment to the border with Mexico, though he was personally recalled to Washington shortly afterward.

Hedekin was promoted to brigadier general on June 26, 1918. He commanded the 155th Depot Brigade along with replacements at Camp Lee. He then commanded the 15th Cavalry Regiment in October 1919, and then the 7th Cavalry Regiment at Fort Bliss. Hedekin retired on August 5, 1920.

In retirement, Hedekin and his family moved to Bethesda, Maryland, living there for seven years. They sold their house in 1930 to go on an extended vacation in Europe, though they had to return to the U.S. in 1931 because hedekin became ill. He was admitted to Walter Reed Army Medical Center for four months, and he and his family left again for Europe afterward, staying until October 1933. Hedekin died in Washington, D.C., on January 30, 1944. He is buried at Arlington National Cemetery.

== Bibliography ==
- Davis, Henry Blaine Jr. (1998). Generals in Khaki. Raleigh, North Carolina: Pentland Press. ISBN 1571970886. OCLC 40298151.
