= James W. McAndrew =

United States Army general

James William McAndrew
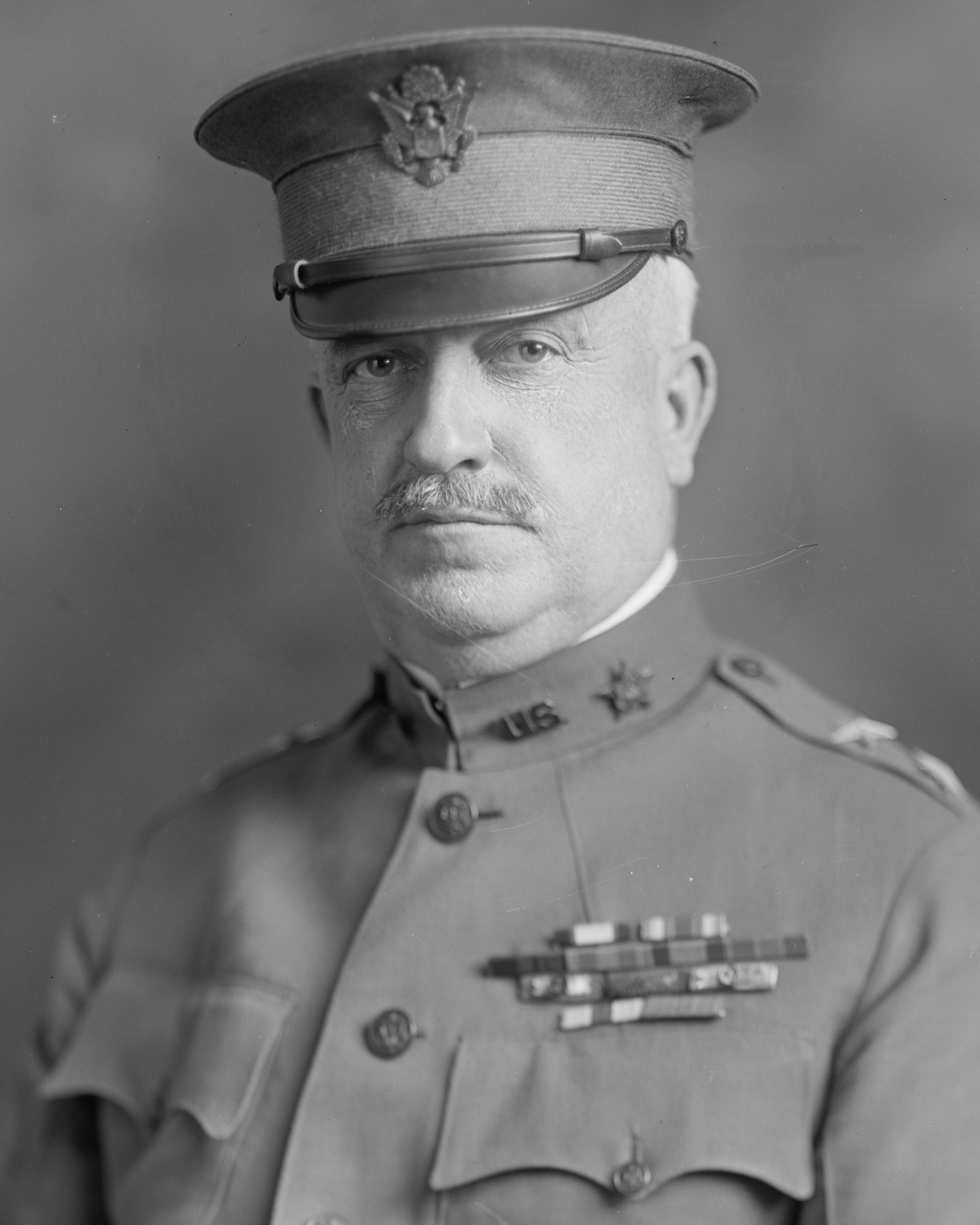
- Born: June 29, 1862; Hawley, Pennsylvania, US
- Died: April 30, 1922 (aged 59); Washington, D.C., US
- Burial place: Arlington National Cemetery
- Military career
- Allegiance: United States of America
- Branch: United States Army
- Service years: 1888–1922
- Rank: Major General
- Service number: 0-22
- Unit: United States Infantry Branch
- Commands: Army Service Schools; 18th Infantry Regiment; 2nd Brigade, 1st Division; American Expeditionary Forces Staff College; Army War College
- Conflicts: Ghost Dance War; Spanish–American War; Philippine–American War; World War I
- Awards: Army Distinguished Service Medal; Knight Commander of the Order of St. Michael and St. George (Great Britain); Croix de Guerre with two Palms (France); Officer of the Legion of Honor (France); Grand Officer of the Order of the Crown (Belgium); Order of Saints Maurice and Lazarus (Italy); Order of the Crown of Italy; Order of Prince Danilo I (Montenegro); Medal of La Solidaridad (Panama)

James William McAndrew (June 29, 1862 – April 30, 1922) was a career officer in the United States Army. He attained the rank of major general, and was most notable for his service as chief of staff of the American Expeditionary Forces during World War I.

A native of Hawley, Pennsylvania, McAndrew graduated from the United States Military Academy in 1888 and was commissioned as a second lieutenant of Infantry. His early assignments were in the western United States, and he took part in the Ghost Dance War of 1890–1891. He served in Cuba during the Spanish–American War, including the Battle of El Caney and the Siege of Santiago, and in the Philippines during the Philippine–American War.

As McAndrew's career progressed, he completed the Army School of the Line (1910), Command and General Staff College (1911), and Army War College (1913). At the start of World War I, he was promoted to colonel as commander of the 18th Infantry Regiment. He commanded the regiment until he was promoted to temporary brigadier general as commander of 2nd Brigade, 1st Division. After service as commandant of the American Expeditionary Forces Staff College in Langres, McAndrew was promoted to major general and assigned as AEF chief of staff. He served in this position until the end of the war, and received credit for steps to improves the AEF staff's efficiency with respect to its planning process and preparation of operations orders.

After the war, McAndrew was assigned as commandant of the Army War College. He suffered health problems brought on by overexerting himself during his AEF service, and died in Washington, D.C., on April 30, 1922. He was buried at Arlington National Cemetery.

== Early life ==
James William McAndrew was born in Hawley, Pennsylvania, on June 29, 1862, the son of John Richard and Eliza (Kane) McAndrew. John McAndrew was employed in the Hawley office of the Pennsylvania Coal Company. McAndrew attended the schools of Hawley, and then St. Francis Xavier College in New York City.

Appointed to the United States Military Academy (USMA) at West Point, New York, in 1884, he graduated 12th in his class of 44 in June 1888 and was commissioned a second lieutenant of Infantry. Among his fellow graduates included many men who would later rise to the rank of brigadier general or higher in their military careers. They included: Henry Jervey, Charles H. McKinstry, William V. Judson, George W. Burr, John L. Hayden, William S. Peirce, John S. Winn, Peyton C. March, Charles A. Hedekin, Francis J. Koester, John D. L. Hartman, Robert L. Howze, Edward R. Chrisman, Guy H. Preston, William R. Sample, Edward Anderson, Peter C. Harris, Munroe McFarland, William H. Hart, William R. Dashiell, Eli A. Helmick and William T. Littlebrant.

== Start of career ==
Assigned to the 21st Infantry Regiment, McAndrew served initially in the western United States, and took part in the Ghost Dance War against the Sioux in 1890–1891. He was promoted to first lieutenant in 1894, and assigned to the 3rd Infantry. McAndrew served in Cuba during the Spanish–American War, and took part in the Battle of El Caney and the Siege of Santiago. In 1899, McAndrew was promoted to captain, and he served in the Philippines during the Philippine–American War. From 1905 to 1906, he served with the 3rd Infantry in Skagway, Alaska.

== Later career ==
Andrews was an instructor at the Army Service Schools until 1909. He was an honor graduate of his Army School of the Line class in 1910, and graduated from the Command and General Staff College in 1911, after which he remained on the faculty and was promoted to major. In 1913 he graduated from the Army War College, after which he served on the Army staff at the War Department. He was promoted to lieutenant colonel in 1916, and was appointed to succeed Charles Miller as commandant of the Army Service Schools.

== World War I ==
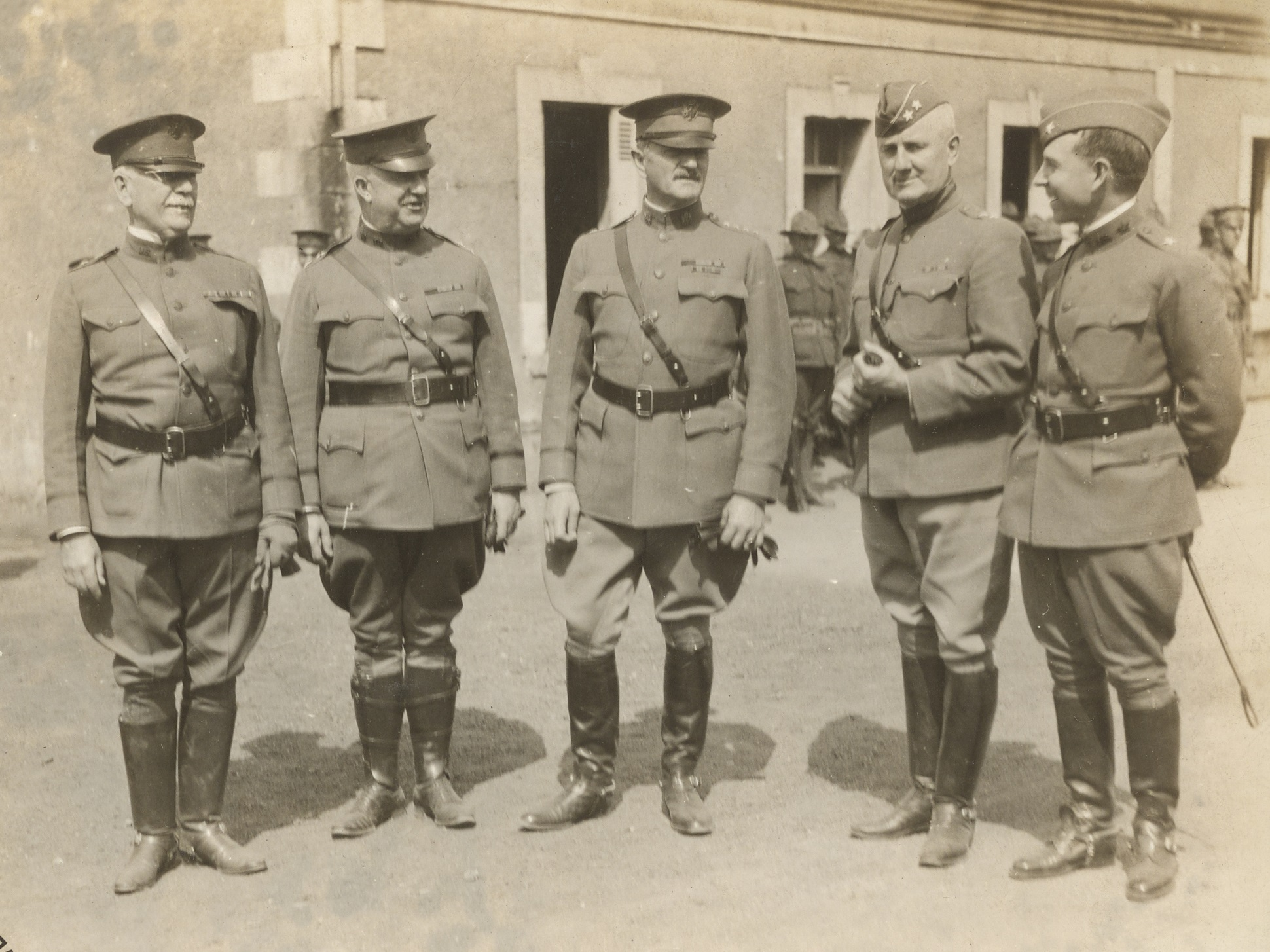
From left to right: Major General Francis J. Kernan, Major General James W. McAndrew, General John J. Pershing, Major General James Harbord and Brigadier General Johnson Hagood in Tours, France, July 1918.

Shortly after the American entry into World War I in April 1917, McAndrew was, in May, promoted to colonel and assigned as commander of the 18th Infantry Regiment. He led the regiment to France, and commanded it until he was promoted to temporary brigadier general in August and appointed to command the 2nd Infantry Brigade, 1st Division, the 18th Infantry's parent formation.

On October 15 he was assigned as commandant of the newly created Command and Staff College of the American Expeditionary Forces (AEF) in Langres, where, in addition to the staff college, he organized the AEF School of the Line, Officer Candidate School, Infantry School, and Tank School in order to train soldiers for their combat duties.

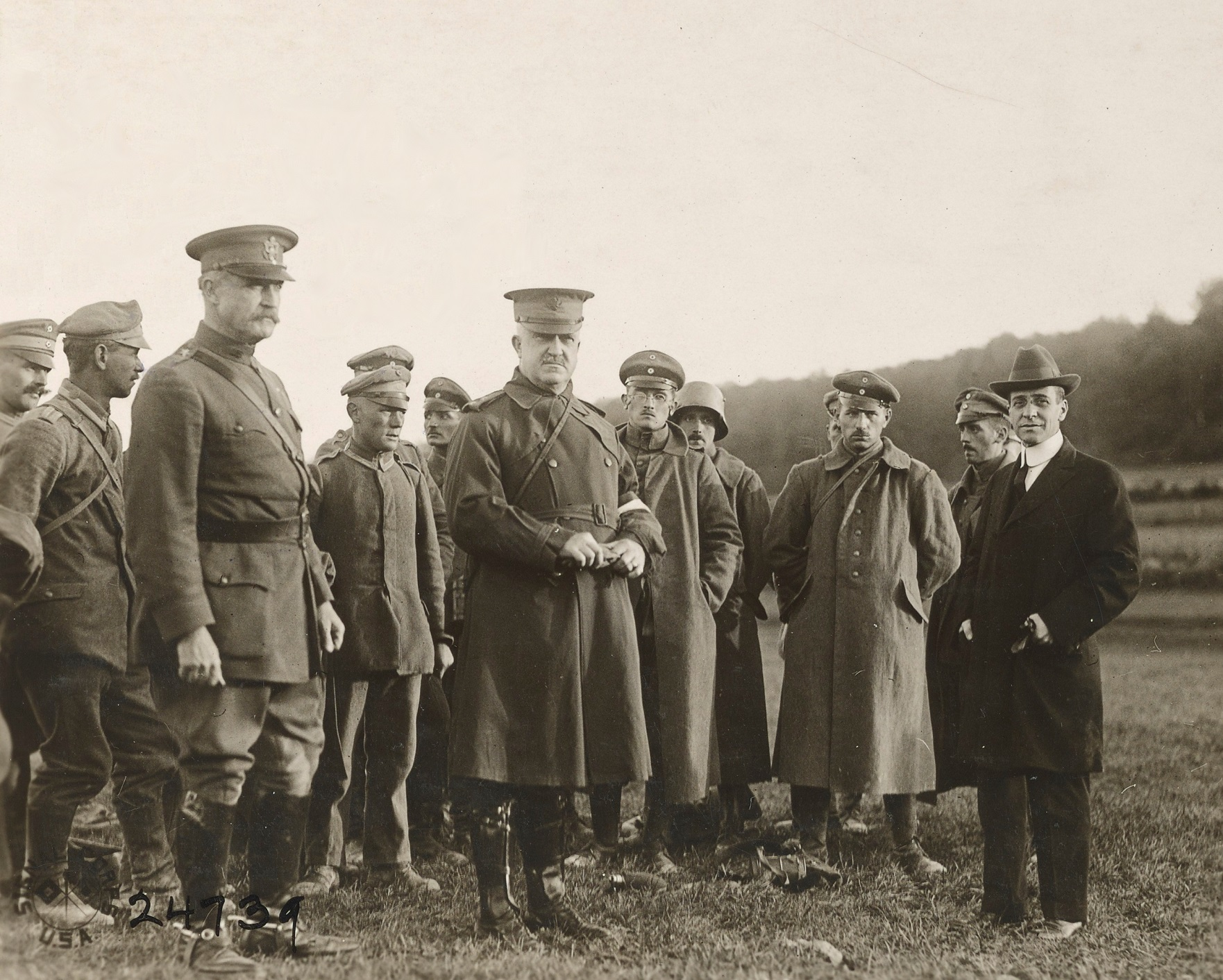
Major General James W. McAndrew (center) with Secretary of War Newton D. Baker (right), Major General Andre W. Brewster (left) and a group of German prisoners in September 1918.

In May 1918 General John J. Pershing, commander-in-chief (C-in-C) of the AEF, named McAndrew to succeed Brigadier General James Harbord as chief of staff of the AEF after Harbord went to command an infantry brigade of the 2nd Division. He was promoted to temporary major general while in this post, and served in this important position until June 1919.

As chief of staff of the AEF, McAndrew played a key role in planning and coordinating operations. He worked closely with Pershing and other senior commanders to develop strategies, allocate resources, and provide logistical support. His experience as a staff officer and commander informed his approach to problem-solving and leadership.

During the Battle of Saint-Mihiel, which began on September 12, McAndrew helped coordinate the AEF's First Army attack, ensuring effective communication and resource allocation. The operation aimed to eliminate the St Mihiel salient, a position held by the Germans in France since 1914. The AEF's First Army, formed the month before and comprising the bulk of the AEF's strength, launched this operation under Pershing's leadership, who simultaneously commanded the entire AEF.

In the Meuse–Argonne offensive, launched on September 26, McAndrew's role involved overseeing logistics, troop movements, and supply chain management for the AEF's First Army. Later, as the battle wore on, the AEF was divided into the First and Second armies. The First Army, now commanded by Lieutenant General Hunter Liggett, continued to play a key role in the offensive.

The AEF's largest operation of the war – and the largest and bloodiest in American military history – ultimately involved over 1.2 million American servicemen and women. They advanced against some of the strongest German positions on the Western Front. The operation ended on November 11 with the Armistice with Germany, which finally ended the war.

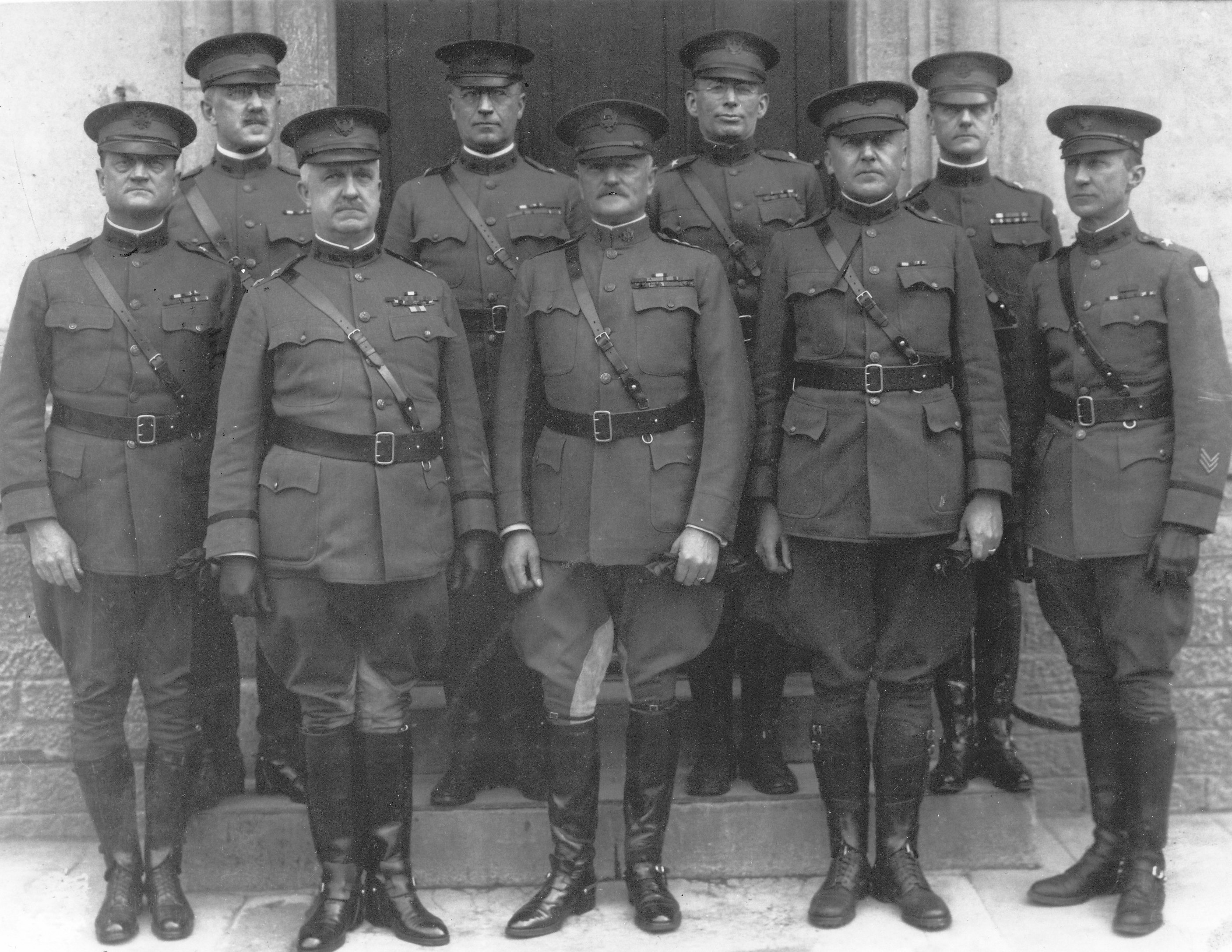
General John J. Pershing (center) and members of his staff. Stood to Pershing's right is his chief of staff, Major General James W. McAndrew.

McAndrew, who permanent rank was advanced to brigadier general on November 8, was praised for the leadership and management style he brought to the AEF staff, including speeding up the planning process and preparation of operations orders by delegating as much authority as possible, including allowing senior staff officers to issue directives in Pershing's name when circumstances required it. Though his initiatives enabled the AEF staff to function more efficiently, they were also criticized for creating resentment between the AEF staff and subordinate army and corps commanders, who believed that their authority was being diminished.

== Post-World War I ==
After serving with the post-war Army of Occupation in Germany, McAndrew returned to the United States in 1919 to become the first post-war commandant of the Army War College. He was promoted to permanent major general in July 1920.

== Death and burial ==
McAndrew's exertions during World War I aggravated a heart condition, and he was often in ill health beginning in 1920. He died at Walter Reed Hospital in Washington, D.C., on April 30, 1922. His wife was with him at his death, as were two of his sisters, longtime friend Colonel James B. Gowen, and General Pershing. He was buried at Arlington National Cemetery, Section 3 Grave 2519.

== Family ==
McAndrew's siblings included: Richard, who was ordained as a priest in 1877 and served for many years in Wilkes-Barre, Pennsylvania; Patrick, a career Army surgeon who attained the rank of colonel; Jane, the wife of Scranton, Pennsylvania, merchant M. J. Healey; Mary, a school teacher; Harriet, an Ursuline nun who lived and worked in Youngstown, Ohio; Eliza, the wife of locomotive construction superintendent Thomas F. Howley of Dunmore, Pennsylvania; and Kathryn, the wife of Erie Railroad agent John Creighton, of Caldwell, New Jersey.

On November 26, 1889, McAndrew married Nellie Elizabeth Roche of Scranton. They were the parents of a daughter, Mary Aloysiz McAndrew, who died in 1908.

== Awards ==
For his World War I service, McAndrew was a recipient of the Army Distinguished Service Medal, Knight Commander of the Order of St. Michael and St. George (Great Britain), Croix de Guerre with two Palms and Officer of the Legion of Honor (France), Grand Officer of the Order of the Crown (Belgium), Order of Saints Maurice and Lazarus and Order of the Crown of Italy (Italy), Order of Prince Danilo I (Montenegro), and Medal of La Solidaridad (Panama).

In 1918, McAndrew received the honorary degree of LL.D. from Fordham University.

== Sources ==
=== Newspapers ===
- "Acting Head and Assistant Named for Army Schools". Leavenworth Times. Leavenworth, KS. August 1, 1916 – via Newspapers.com.
- Becker, Peter (January 7, 2013). "Patrick H. McAndrew, Army Surgeon". The News Eagle. Hawley, PA. Archived from the original on June 21, 2018.
- Becker, Peter (January 21, 2013). "Hawley's Own Major General Gen. James W. McAndrew Served as Pershing's Chief of Staff in World War I". The News Eagle. Hawley, PA. Archived from the original on June 21, 2018.

== Books ==
- Cooke, James J. (1977). Pershing And His Generals. Westport, CT: Praeger. ISBN 978-0-275-95363-8.
- Davis, Henry Blaine Jr. (1998). Generals in Khaki. Raleigh, NC: Pentland Press. ISBN 978-1-57197-088-6.
- Lengel, Edward G. (2014-03-04). A Companion to the Meuse-Argonne Campaign. Hoboken, NJ: Wiley-Blackwell. ISBN 978-1-4443-5094-4.
- Association of Graduates, United States Military Academy (1922). Fifty-Third Annual Report of the Association of Graduates. Saginaw, MI: Seeman & Peters.

=== Internet ===
- "Burial Detail: McAndrew, James A". ANC Explorer. Arlington, VA: Arlington National Cemetery.

Military offices
Preceded by Newly reestablished organization	Commandant of the United States Army War College; 1919–1921	Succeeded by Edward McGlachlin Jr.
