= Eli Alva Helmick =

United States Army officer (1863–1945)

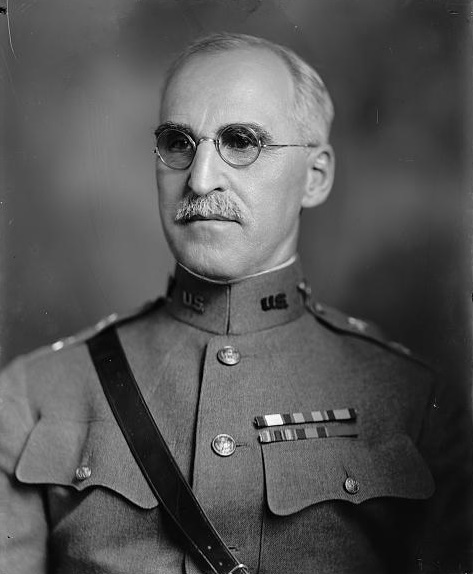
- Born: September 23, 1863; Quaker, Indiana, United States
- Died: January 13, 1945 (aged 81); Honolulu, Hawaii, United States
- Burial place: Arlington National Cemetery, Virginia, United States
- Spouse: Elizabeth Allen Clarke
- Children: 3
- Military career
- Allegiance: United States
- Branch: United States Army
- Service years: 1888–1927
- Rank: Major General
- Service number: 0-213
- Unit: Infantry Branch
- Commands: 8th Division; 11th Brigade
- Conflicts: Spanish–American War; Philippine–American War; Border War; World War I
- Awards: Army Distinguished Service Medal; Silver Star

Major General Eli Alva Helmick (September 23, 1863 – January 13, 1945) was a United States Army officer in the late 19th and early 20th centuries. He served in World War I, among other conflicts, and received the Distinguished Service Medal.

== Military career ==
Helmick was born in Quaker, Indiana, on September 23, 1863. He graduated from the United States Military Academy (USMA) at West Point, New York, in June 1888. Among his classmates there were several men who would, like Helmick himself, eventually attain the rank of general officer, such as James W. McAndrew, William M. Morrow, William Robert Dashiell, Robert Lee Howze, Peter Charles Harris, Peyton C. March, Henry Jervey, William Voorhees Judson, John Louis Hayden, Edward Anderson, William H. Hart, Charles Aloysius Hedekin and William S. Peirce.

Helmick was commissioned into the 11th Infantry Regiment on June 11, 1888, and he did frontier duty from 1888 to 1892. He was serving in Idaho when the labor union riots in Coeur d'Alene, Idaho, occurred from September to November 1892. He served on duty at the World's Columbian Exposition in Chicago, and he then worked as a professor of Military Science and Tactics at Hillsdale College from 1894 through 1896. Helmick commanded Fort Reno from 1898 to 1899.

Helmick participated in the Spanish–American War, serving from 1899 to 1901 as a provost marshal and inspector of the Cuban Rural Guard, and receiving a Silver Star for his efforts. He then went to the Philippines, commanding a battalion on Mindanao in 1902 against the Moros during the Moro Rebellion. After returning to the U.S., Helmick did recruiting duty in Springfield, Massachusetts from 1903 to 1906, and he commanded Fort Liscum from 1906 to 1907. He graduated from the School of the Line in 1909, from the United States Army War College in 1910. Helmick then performed Mexican Border War service along the U.S. border with Mexico from 1915 to 1916.

Helmick served during World War I, and was promoted to major general on August 8, 1918. He commanded the 8th Division from September to November 1918 and afterward commanded Base Section Number Five, Service of Supply in Brest, France. He received the Army Distinguished Service Medal for his service in Brest. The citation for the medal reads:

The President of the United States of America, authorized by Act of Congress, July 9, 1918, takes pleasure in presenting the Army Distinguished Service Medal to Major General Eli Alva Helmick, United States Army, for exceptionally meritorious and distinguished services to the Government of the United States, in a duty of great responsibility during World War I. As Commanding General, Base Section No. 5, General Helmick has displayed brilliant administrative ability in successfully directing the manifold activities under his supervision. By his energy in expediting the completion of the various engineering projects necessitated by the enlargement of the Pontanezen Camp and the development of Brest as a foremost embarkation camp, he has rendered invaluable services to the American Expeditionary Forces.

Helmick joined the General Staff on August 24, 1919, and he served as the Chief of Staff of the Central Department from August 23, 1919, to May 10, 1921. In 1920, he received the honorary degree of LL.D. from Kansas State Agricultural College. He subsequently became inspector general and was reappointed to the position on November 7, 1925. Helmick retired on September 27, 1927.

Helmick lived in Honolulu in retirement. He died on January 13, 1945, and was buried at Arlington National Cemetery.

== Personal life ==
Helmick married Elizabeth Allen Clarke on November 20, 1889, and they had three children together. Son Charles G. Helmick was a US army major general and the father of Joyce Gardiner Helmick, who was married to Lieutenant General David E. Ott.

== Bibliography ==
- Davis, Henry Blaine Jr. (1998). Generals in Khaki. Raleigh, North Carolina: Pentland Press. ISBN 1571970886. OCLC 40298151.
- Marquis Who's Who (1975). Who Was Who In American History – The Military. Chicago, Illinois: Marquis Who's Who. ISBN 0837932017.

Military offices
Preceded by Joseph D. Leitch	Commanding General 8th Division; 1918–1919	Succeeded by John J. Bradley
