= William Robert Dashiell =

United States Army general (1863–1939)

William Dashiell
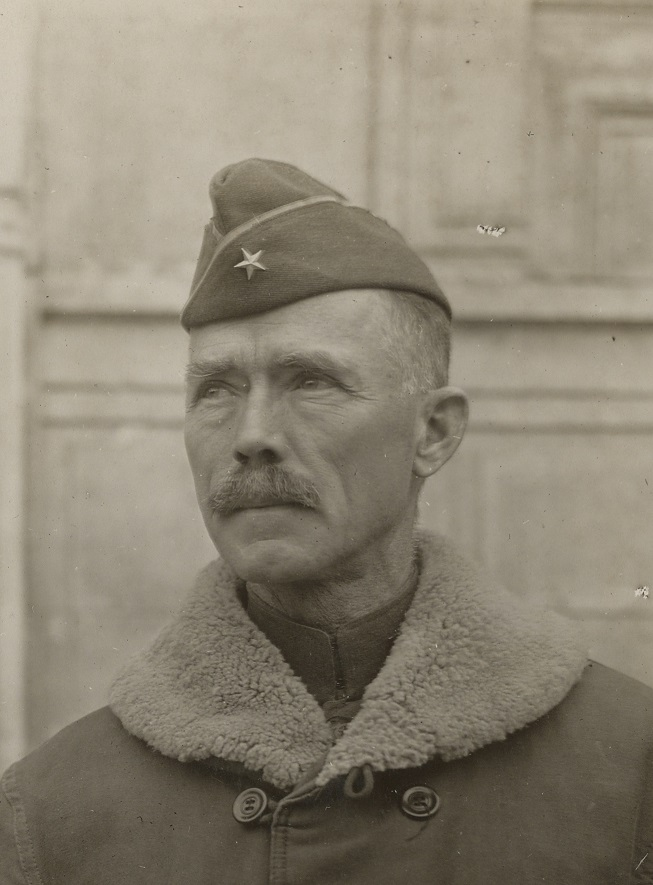
- Brigadier General William Dashiell in Côte-d'Or, c. 1918.
- Born: 3 April 1863; Mecklenburg County, Virginia, United States
- Died: 16 March 1939 (aged 75); Atlanta, Georgia, United States
- Burial place: Arlington National Cemetery, Virginia, United States
- Military career
- Allegiance: United States
- Branch: United States Army
- Service years: 1888–1936
- Rank: Brigadier General
- Service number: 0-212
- Unit: Infantry Branch
- Commands: 11th Brigade
- Conflicts: Philippine–American War; World War I
- Awards: Silver Star (Citation Star)

Brigadier General William Robert Dashiell (3 April 1863 – 16 March 1939) was a United States Army officer. He notably participated in the Philippine–American War and World War I.

== Early life and education ==
Dashiell was born Mecklenburg County, Virginia on 3 April 1863. He graduated from the United States Military Academy (USMA) at West Point, New York, in 1888, where he was a classmate of several future general officers, such as Peyton C. March, William M. Morrow, James W. McAndrew, Robert Lee Howze, Peter Charles Harris, Eli Alva Helmick, Henry Jervey, William Voorhees Judson, John Louis Hayden, Edward Anderson, William H. Hart, Charles Aloysius Hedekin and William S. Peirce.

Dashiell later graduated from the Army School of the Line (1909) and the Army War College (1915).

== Military career ==
After graduation, Dashiell was commissioned second lieutenant with the 8th Infantry Regiment at Fort D. A. Russell in Wyoming. He took part in conflicts with American Indians, including the Sioux Campaign of 1890–1891 and while posted in Arizona and Utah 1896–1899.

In the interlude between 1892 and 1895, Dashiell was also a professor of Military Science and Tactics at the then North Georgia Agricultural College.

During the Spanish–American War, although Dashiell's regiment was in Cuba, he himself was posted as commander of Fort Douglas in Utah. In 1899, Dashiell took part in the Philippine–American War, as commander of Company C in the 24th Infantry under the ill-fated General Henry Lawton. Dashiell returned to the Philippines again for a second tour of duty from 1906 to 1908, during which he was briefly commander of Camp Downes on the island of Leyte and then commander of the island's Third District during a Pulahan uprising.

After returning from the Philippines, Dashiell was commander of the Madison Barracks in New York during 1908 and then commandant at Virginia Polytechnic Institute from 1909 to 1911. Dashiell was then stationed at various U.S. military installations from 1911 to 1917, including Fort Sheridan in Illinois, Fort Shafter in Hawaii and Fort Douglas in Utah.

Upon the American entry into World War I, Dashiell was promoted to brigadier general of the National Army on 12 April 1918 and arrived in France in July. There he commanded the 11th Infantry Brigade of the 6th Infantry Division, supporting the 1st Army during the Meuse-Argonne Offensive. Dashiell remained in France until 1919 and received a Silver Star for his service. After leaving France, Dashiell returned to Hawaii and was stationed for some time at Schofield Barracks.

From 1925 to 1932, he taught at various schools in the state of Georgia, including in Atlanta and Fulton County.

== Awards ==
- Silver Star

== Personal life and death ==
Dashiell was married to Ida L. Pearson on 16 November 1899, they had no children. He lived in Atlanta, Georgia until his death on 16 March 1939.
