= Peyton C. March Jr. =

United States Army officer and military aviator (1896-1918)

Peyton Conway March Jr. (January 1, 1897 – February 13, 1918) was an officer of the United States Army and military aviator.

== Early life and education ==
March was the son of Peyton C. and Josephine Smith (née Cunningham) March and was born at Fort Monroe, Virginia, where his father was stationed. He attended Lafayette College in Easton, Pennsylvania, where his grandfather, Francis March a professor. March was the first to hold the title of "Professor of English Language and Literature" anywhere in the United States or Europe.

== Military career ==
In 1917, March enlisted in the United States Army and was assigned to the Aviation Section of the Signal Corps. He trained in Toronto and Austin, Texas. In 1918, March was commissioned as a second lieutenant in the Signal Corps after completing flying tests and gunnery instruction. On February 12, 1918, he was seriously injured in an airplane accident at Hicks Field, near Fort Worth, Texas, and died of his injuries in the base hospital on February 13, age 21. He was buried at Arlington National Cemetery.

== Honors ==
The following month, on March 11, 1918, March Field (present day March Joint Air Reserve Base), located ten miles southeast of Riverside, California, was named in his honor.
