= Peter Charles Harris =

Adjutant General of the U.S. Army

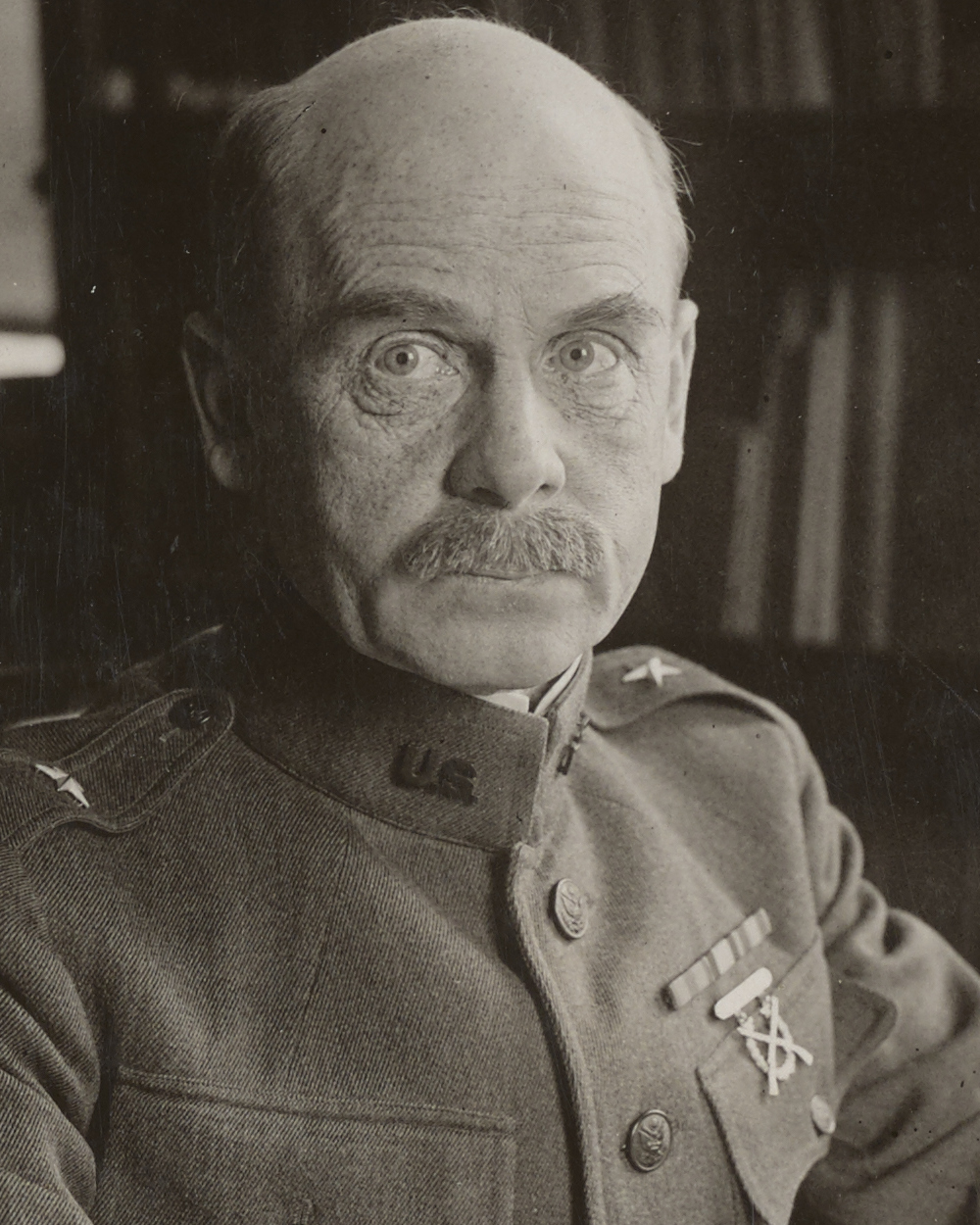
- Born: November 10, 1865; Kingston, Georgia, US
- Died: March 18, 1951 (aged 85); Washington, D.C., US
- Burial place: Princeton Cemetery, Princeton, New Jersey, US
- Relatives: William J. Harris (brother); Seale Harris (brother); Hunter Harris Jr. (nephew)
- Military career
- Allegiance: United States
- Branch: United States Army
- Service years: 1888–1922
- Rank: Major General
- Service number: 0-13
- Unit: Infantry Branch
- Commands: Adjutant General of the U.S. Army
- Conflicts: Spanish–American War; Philippine–American War; World War I
- Awards: Army Distinguished Service Medal

Peter Charles Harris (November 10, 1865 – March 18, 1951) was an American military officer who was Adjutant General of the United States Army from 1918 to 1922. He held the rank of Major General.

== Early life and education ==
Harris was born on November 10, 1865, in Kingston, Georgia. He attended the United States Military Academy and graduated in the class of 1888. Among his classmates there were several men who would, like Harris himself, eventually attain the rank of general officer, such as James W. McAndrew, William M. Morrow, William Robert Dashiell, Robert Lee Howze, Peyton C. March, Eli Alva Helmick, Henry Jervey, William Voorhees Judson, John Louis Hayden, Edward Anderson, William H. Hart, Charles Aloysius Hedekin and William S. Peirce.

== Military career ==
He received a commission for the 13th Infantry Regiment. He also served with the 9th Infantry, the 10th Infantry, and the Twenty-Fourth Infantry.

In June 1895, Harris was an honor graduate of the Infantry and Cavalry School at Fort Leavenworth, Kansas.

He participated in the Battle of San Juan Hill and the Siege of Santiago de Cuba, during the Spanish–American War.

He served in the Philippines from 1899 to 1900, from 1905 to 1907, from December 1912 to March 1914 and again from August 1914 to October 1915.

In 1908, Harris graduated from the Army War College. In March 1911, he was promoted to major.

In August 1914, he started service with the Adjutant General's Corps in the Philippines. In September 1914, his transfer from the infantry became official. In 1916, he joined the Adjutant General's Office in Washington, D.C.. Harris was promoted to lieutenant colonel in July 1916 and colonel in May 1917. He was appointed adjutant general on September 1, 1918. Harris accepted promotions to brigadier general in February 1918 and major general in October 1918.

He retired from service on August 31, 1922.

== Awards ==
He received the Army Distinguished Service Medal due to his services during World War I. The citation for the medal reads:

The President of the United States of America, authorized by Act of Congress, July 9, 1918, takes pleasure in presenting the Army Distinguished Service Medal to Major General Peter Charles Harris, United States Army, for exceptionally meritorious and distinguished services to the Government of the United States, in a duty of great responsibility during World War I. During his service in the Adjutant General's Department, General Harris' zeal, energy, and judgment have been made manifest by the reforms accomplished in record keeping systems in the War Department and in the Army.

His other awards and honors included Commander in the Legion of Honour from France and Commander in the Order of the Crown of Italy.

== Personal ==
Harris was the son of physician Dr. Charles Hooks Harris and his wife Margaret Ann (Monk) Harris. He had four brothers and five sisters. Among his brothers were U.S. Senator from Georgia William J. Harris and Alabama physician Dr. Seale Harris.

On October 6, 1894, Harris married Mary Guthrie at Fort Reno, Oklahoma Territory. They had three sons, all of whom died young: Bayard Guthrie (1895–1909), Charles Dashiell (1897–1918) and John Guthrie (1898–1899). Captain Charles D. Harris was an August 1917 West Point graduate and military engineer who was mortally wounded in action at Clairs Chênes Wood near Cunel, France in October 1918, earning the Distinguished Service Cross.

== Death and legacy ==
Harris lived in Washington, D.C. after retirement and died at Walter Reed Medical Center on March 18, 1951. He is buried in Princeton Cemetery in Princeton, New Jersey.

== See also ==
- List of Adjutant Generals of the U.S. Army
- List of major generals in the United States Regular Army before July 1, 1920

Military offices
Preceded by Henry P. McCain	Adjutant General of the U. S. Army; September 1, 1918-August 31, 1922	Succeeded by Robert C. Davis
