= Robert Lee Howze =

United States Army general

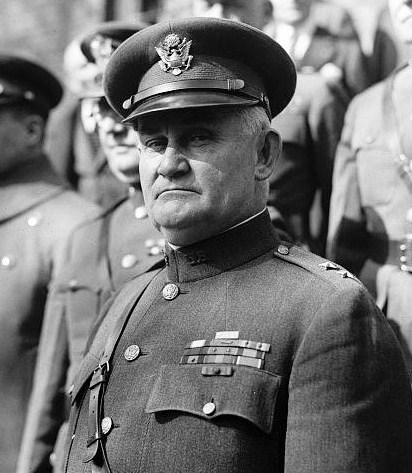
- Howze as a major general
- Born: August 22, 1864; Overton, Texas, US
- Died: September 19, 1926 (aged 62); Columbus, Ohio, US
- Burial place: West Point Cemetery; 41.39896, −73.96729
- Relatives: Major General Robert Lee Howze Jr. (son); General Hamilton H. Howze (son)
- Military career
- Allegiance: United States
- Branch: United States Army
- Service years: 1888–1926
- Rank: Major General
- Commands: 38th Division; 3rd Division; Third United States Army; 1st Cavalry Division; Fifth Corps Area
- Conflicts: Indian Wars; Spanish–American War; Philippine–American War; World War I
- Awards: Medal of Honor; Army Distinguished Service Medal; Silver Star (2); Legion of Honour (France); Croix de Guerre (France)

Robert Lee Howze (August 22, 1864 – September 19, 1926) was a United States Army major general who was a recipient of the Medal of Honor for his actions during the American Indian Wars.

Howze graduated from the United States Military Academy in 1888 and then accepted a commission to the United States Army. He first served in the Indian Wars, then served in the Spanish–American War, Philippine–American War and World War I. His last assignment was presiding over the courts-martial of Colonel Billy Mitchell.

== Early life ==
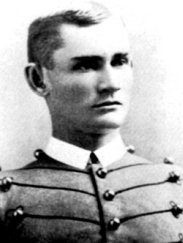
Howze as a West Point cadet

Howze was born to Captain James A. Howze, of the 14th Texas Cavalry, and Amanda Hamilton Howze in Overton, Rusk County, Texas. After graduating from Hubbard College in 1883, he attended the United States Military Academy (USMA) at West Point, New York and was in the graduating class of 1888. His classmates included several future general officers, such as Peyton C. March, William M. Morrow, James W. McAndrew, William Robert Dashiell, Peter Charles Harris, Eli Alva Helmick, Henry Jervey, William Voorhees Judson, John Louis Hayden, Edward Anderson, William H. Hart, Charles Aloysius Hedekin and William S. Peirce.

== Military career ==
Howze participated in the Pine Ridge Campaign from November 1890 to January 1891. On January 1, 1891, the 6th Cavalry crossed the frozen White River in South Dakota to engage a group of Brulé Sioux. It was for this action he was presented with the Medal of Honor.

Howze married Anne Chiffelle Hawkins, daughter of General Hamilton S. Hawkins and sister of General Hamilton S. Hawkins III, on February 24, 1897.

At the outbreak of the Spanish–American War, Howze, now a cavalry captain, was made adjutant general of the cavalry in Cuba. Upon his return to the United States, he was appointed lieutenant colonel of volunteers and commanded the Thirty-fourth Volunteer Infantry throughout the Philippine Insurrection. He was promoted to captain in the United States Army on February 2, 1901; to brigadier general of volunteers on June 20, 1901; and to major of the Puerto Rico provincial regiment of infantry in 1901. He received two Silver Citation Stars (converted in 1932 to the Silver Star decoration) for actions respectively in Cuba and the Philippines.

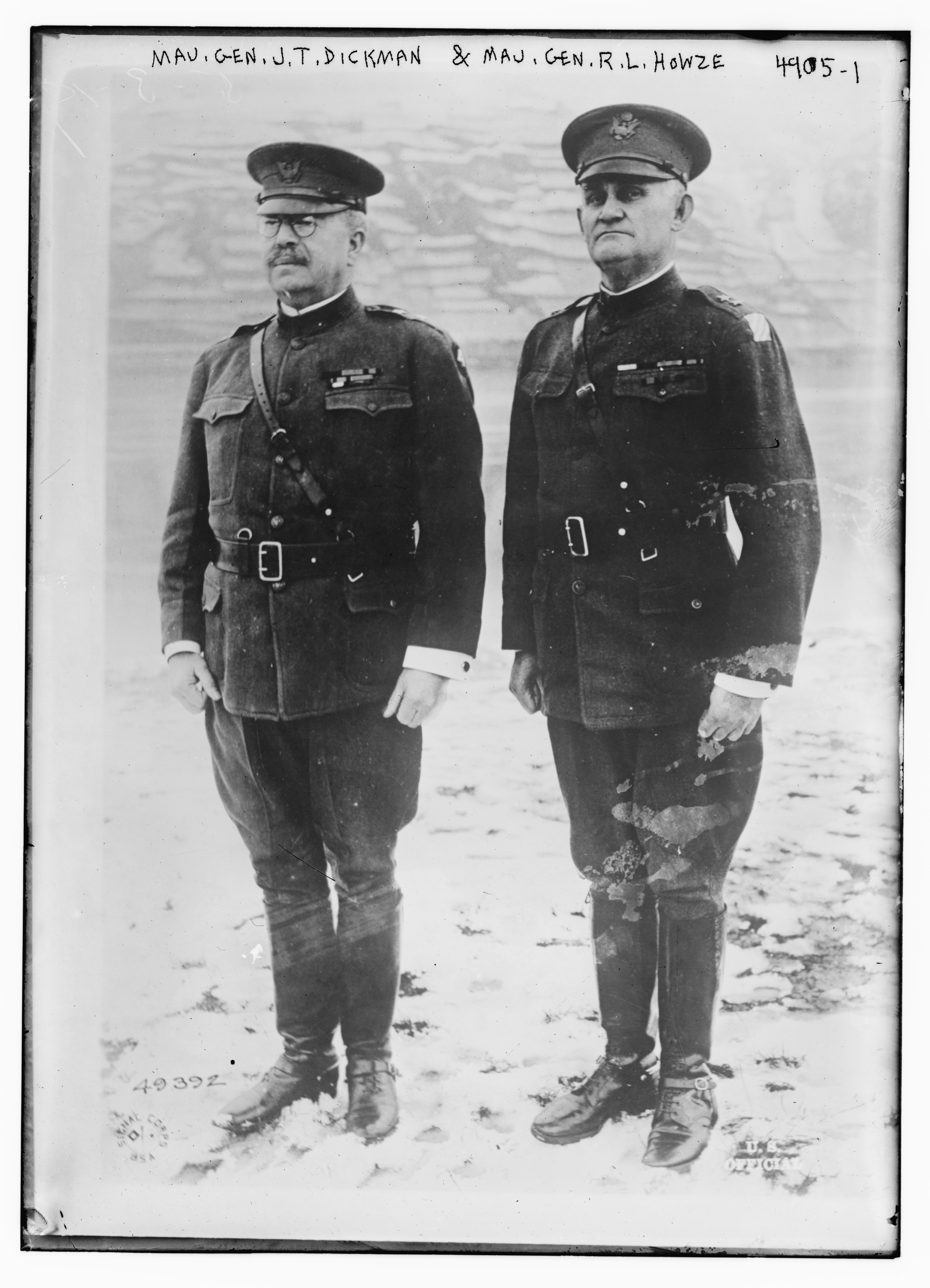
Major General Joseph T. Dickman and Major General Robert Lee Howze.

In 1905, Howze was appointed commandant of cadets at West Point, remaining in that post until 1909. In 1907 he threatened to discharge an entire class from the academy over a hazing incident. Howze was a major in the 11th Cavalry during General John J. Pershing's Punitive Expedition into Mexico in 1916.

Shortly after the American entry into World War I in April 1917 Howze was promoted to colonel in May and became chief of staff of the Northeastern Department in Boston, Massachusetts.

In February 1918, after being promoted to the rank of brigadier general, he assumed command of the 2nd Cavalry Brigade, then based at Fort Bliss, Texas, which had the often difficult and contradictory role of both training his men to fight for service overseas in addition to patrolling the U.S.-Mexican border.

In May of that year he received another assignment, this time to the command of the El Paso District, which brought all American troops stationed in and around the city of El Paso, Texas under his control, including his old 2nd Cavalry Brigade.

Despite this new role, his desire was to command men in battle and in late August, after a promotion to the temporary rank of major general earlier in the month, he was made commanding general (CG) of the 38th Division. The division, at the time Howze joined it, was then making preparations to go to France.

Created just the year before, the division, a National Guard formation comprising men from the states of Indiana, Kentucky, and West Virginia, left the United States and began arriving on the Western Front over the next few weeks. Shortly after it arrived, however, Howze received the unwelcome news that his division was to be broken up, its men used as replacements to bring other divisions of the American Expeditionary Forces (AEF), the majority of which were severely under strength, up to strength. As a result, in a matter of weeks, the 38th Division, numbering some 27,000 officers and men at its peak, was reduced to a mere 8 officers and 102 enlisted men.

Shortly after the Armistice with Germany on November 11, which brought a close to hostilities, General John J. Pershing, the commander-in-chief (C-in-C) of the AEF and a fellow cavalryman, ordered Howze to take over the 3rd Division. The latter duly did so and led the 3rd, one of the AEF's top divisions when the fighting was ongoing, into Germany as part of Major General Joseph T. Dickman's newly activated Third Army and in the subsequent occupation of the Rhineland which lasted until August 1919. He was awarded the Army Distinguished Service Medal, the French Croix de Guerre, and French Legion of Honor for his services in the war and in command of the 3rd Division.

General Howze died while on active duty on September 19, 1926, at age 62, and is buried in the United States Military Academy Cemetery at West Point, New York.

== Court-martial of Billy Mitchell ==
Howze's last assignment was to preside over the court-martial of Colonel Billy Mitchell, who had made public comments in response to the Navy dirigible USS Shenandoah crashing in a storm. The crash killed 14 of the crew and Mitchell issued a statement accusing senior leaders in the Army and Navy of incompetence and "almost treasonable administration of the national defense." In November 1925 he was court-martialed at the direct order of President Calvin Coolidge. The trial attracted significant interest, and public opinion supported Mitchell. The court found Mitchell guilty of insubordination, and suspended him from active duty for five years without pay. The generals ruling in the case wrote, "The Court is thus lenient because of the military record of the Accused during the World War." On February 1, 1926, Mitchell resigned in-lieu of accepting the courts punishment.

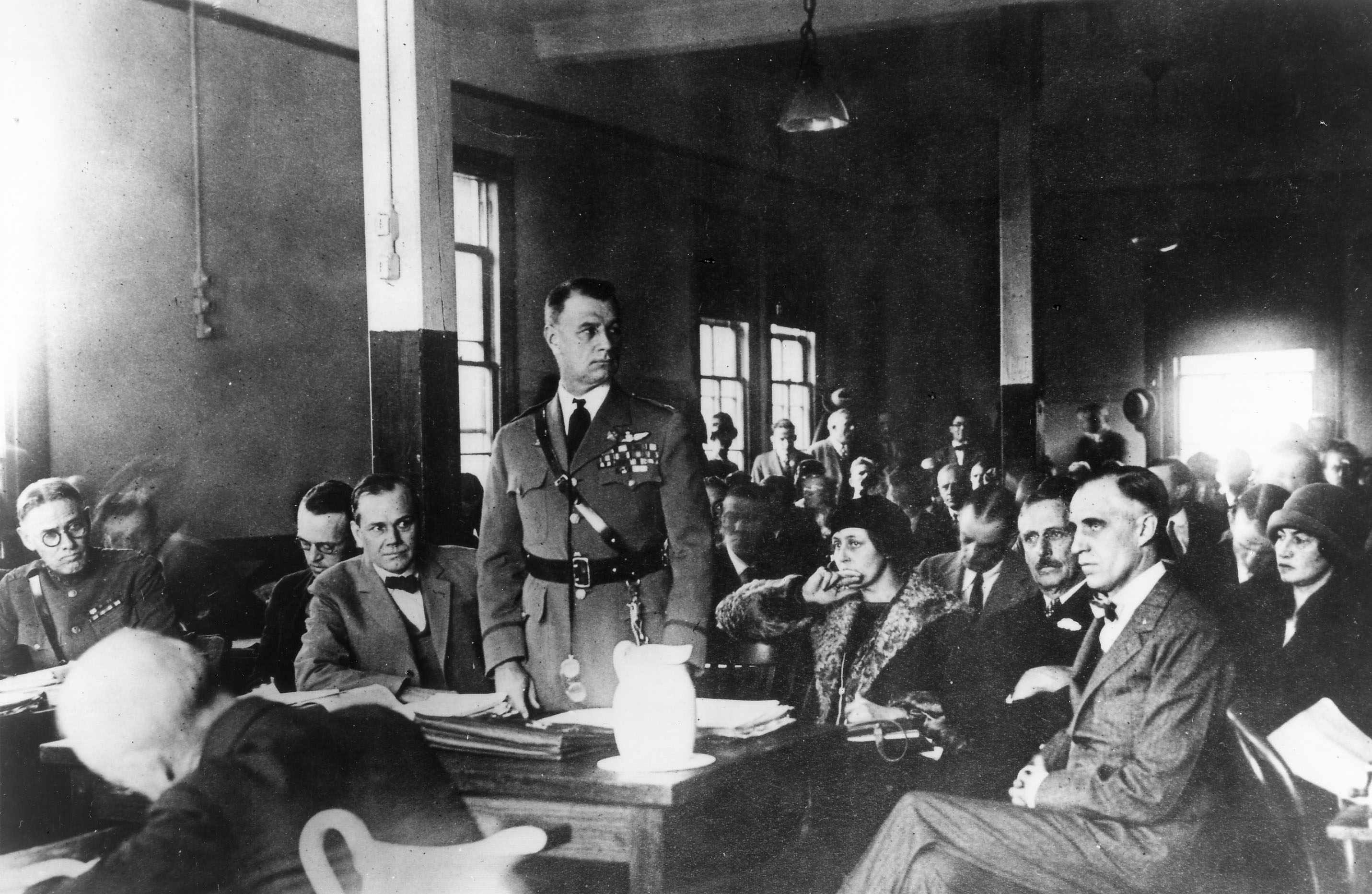
A scene taken from Mitchell's court-martial, 1925.

== Military awards ==
- Medal of Honor
- Distinguished Service Medal
- Silver Star with oak leaf cluster
- Indian Campaign Medal
- Spanish Campaign Medal
- Army of Cuban Occupation Medal
- Philippine Campaign Medal
- Mexican Border Service Medal
- Victory Medal
- Officer, French Legion of Honor
- French Croix de Guerre

=== Medal of Honor citation ===
Rank and organization: Second Lieutenant, Company K, 6th U.S. Cavalry. Place and date: At White River, S. Dak., 1 January 1891. Entered service at: Overton, Rusk County, Tex. Born: 22 August 1864, Overton, Rusk County, Tex. Date of issue: 25 July 1891.

Citation:

Bravery in action.

=== Army Distinguished Service Medal citation ===
Citation:

The President of the United States of America, authorized by Act of Congress, July 9, 1918, takes pleasure in presenting the Army Distinguished Service Medal to Major General Robert Lee Howze, United States Army, for exceptionally meritorious and distinguished services to the Government of the United States, in a duty of great responsibility during World War I. As Commander of the 3d Division on its march to the Rhine and during the occupation of the enemy territory General Howze proved himself energetic and capable, exhibiting superb qualities of leadership. He maintained an unusually high standard of efficiency in his unit, rendering eminently conspicuous service as a Division Commander.

== Dates of rank ==
Insignia	Rank	Component	Date
None	Cadet	United States Military Academy	1 July 1883
None in 1888	Second Lieutenant	Regular Army	11 June 1888
	First Lieutenant	Regular Army	9 January 1896
	Captain	Volunteers	12 May 1898 (Discharged from Volunteers on 31 December 1898.)
	Lieutenant Colonel	Volunteers	5 July 1899 (Discharged from Volunteers 17 April 1901.)
	Captain	Regular Army	2 February 1901
	Brigadier General	Volunteer Army	20 June 1901 (Discharged from Volunteers on 30 June 1901.)
	Major	Volunteers	9 October 1901 (Discharged from Volunteers on 30 June 1904.)
	Major	Regular Army	18 November 1911
	Lieutenant Colonel	Regular Army	1 July 1916
	Colonel	Regular Army	15 May 1917
	Brigadier General	National Army	6 February 1918 (Date of rank was 17 December 1917.)
	Major General	National Army	8 August 1918 (Discharged 15 March 1920.)
	Brigadier General	Regular Army	3 July 1920
	Major General	Regular Army	30 December 1922

Source: Army Register, 1926

== Namesakes ==
=== Camp Howze ===
There were two military installations named in honor of General Howze.

Camp Howze, Texas, was a large World War II training facility near Gainesville, Texas.

Camp Howze, South Korea, was a US Army installation located off Main Supply Route (MSR) 1 near the towns of Kumchon and Paju-Ri.

=== USS General R. L. Howze (AP-134) ===
The USS General R. L. Howze (AP-134), launched May 1943, was named in his honor.

== Relations ==
Two of his sons graduated from the U.S. Military Academy at West Point and became generals: Major General Robert Lee Howze Jr., Class of 1925, and General Hamilton H. Howze, Class of 1930.

== See also ==
- List of Medal of Honor recipients for the Indian Wars
- List of United States Military Academy alumni (Medal of Honor)
