= Peyton C. March =

United States Army general (1864-1955)

Peyton Conway March
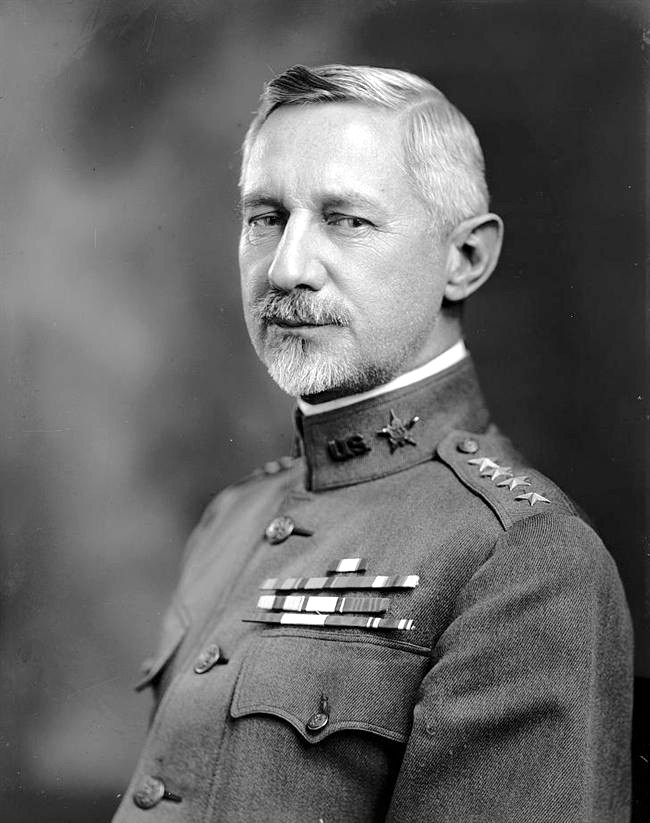
- Official portrait, 1919
- Born: December 27, 1864; Easton, Pennsylvania, U.S.
- Died: April 13, 1955 (aged 90); Walter Reed Army Medical Center, Washington, D.C., U.S.
- Burial place: Arlington National Cemetery; 38°52′59.6″N 77°04′11.3″W
- Children: Peyton C. March Jr. (son)
- Relatives: Dr. Francis March (father)
- Military career
- Branch: United States Army
- Service years: 1888–1921
- Rank: General
- Service number: 0-6
- Unit: Field Artillery Branch
- Commands: Chief of Staff of the Army; First Army Artillery; 1st Field Artillery Brigade; 8th Field Artillery; 1st Battalion, 6th Field Artillery
- Wars: Spanish–American War; Philippine–American War; Russo-Japanese War (observer); Pancho Villa Expedition; World War I; Russian Civil War
- Awards: Distinguished Service Cross; Army Distinguished Service Medal; Silver Star (5)

General Peyton Conway March (December 27, 1864 – April 13, 1955) was a senior officer of the United States Army. He served in the Philippines, on the Mexican border, and World War I. March was the ninth Chief of Staff from 1918 to 1921, accomplishing centralized control over supply, the creation of the Air Service, Tank Corps, and Chemical Warfare Service.

== Early life and education ==
March was born on December 27, 1864, in Easton, Pennsylvania, to Francis Andrew and Mildred (née Conway) March. His father was a college professor, and is regarded as the principal founder of modern comparative linguistics in Old English. His mother descended from Thomas Stone, a signer of the Declaration of Independence, and was Moncure D. Conway's sister.

March attended Lafayette College in Easton, where his father occupied the first chair of English language and comparative philology in the United States. While at Lafayette College, March was a member of the Rho chapter of Delta Kappa Epsilon. After graduating with honors in 1884, he was appointed to West Point and graduated on June 11, 1888, ranked 10th in a class of 44. Among his classmates there were several men who would, like March himself, eventually attain the rank of general officer, such as James W. McAndrew, William M. Morrow, William Robert Dashiell, Robert Lee Howze, Peter Charles Harris, Eli Alva Helmick, Charles Hedges McKinstry, Henry Jervey, William Voorhees Judson, John Louis Hayden, Edward Anderson, Charles Aloysius Hedekin, John S. Winn (who had been March's roommate), and William S. Peirce.

== Career ==
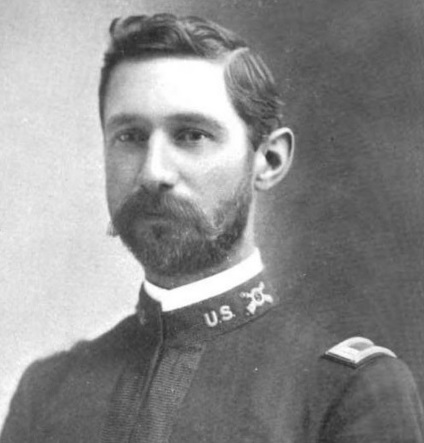
March as a first lieutenant in 1898.

After his initial assignment to the 3rd Artillery, March was assigned to the 5th Artillery as a 1st lieutenant in 1894. He was sent to the Artillery School at Fort Monroe, Virginia in September 1896 and graduated in April 1898, at the outbreak of the Spanish–American War. As he was not immediately assigned, he watched as his classmates went off to various commands, and began fearing he would not see combat. In early May, that changed when he was offered to lead what later became known as the Astor Battery, named so because it was personally financed by John Jacob Astor IV. He organized, equipped and subsequently commanded the battery when it was sent to the Philippines during the Spanish–American War. Historian Bruce Campbell Adamson has written about Henry Bidwell Ely (Adamson's great grandfather) who was placed in charge of The Astor Battery by John Jacob Astor IV, to give Peyton March whatever he needed. March credited Ely as having "an open check book" to purchase uniforms, mules and the cannons.

After the battery returned from the Philippines in 1899, March was assigned as the aide to Major General Arthur MacArthur, Jr. during the Philippine–American War. Later that year he was promoted to major. He continued to serve in the Philippines, participated as part of General Loyd Wheaton's expedition in battles at San Fabian, Buntayan Bridge and San Jacinto. He commanded the U.S. forces in the Battle of Tirad Pass, 2 December 1899, where General Gregorio del Pilar was killed, and received the surrender of General Venacio Concepción, chief of staff to Philippine President Aguinaldo at Cayan, 5 December 1899. He served as provincial governor of districts including Lepanto-Bontoc and Ilocos Sur from February to June 1900, and then the Abra Province from June 1900 to February 1901. He then served as Commissary General of Prisoners for the Philippine Islands through 30 June 1901, when he mustered out of the U.S. Volunteers.

In 1903, he was sent to Fort Riley and commanded the 19th Battery of the Field Artillery. Later that year, he was sent to Washington, D.C., and served on the newly created General Staff.

From March 21 to November 30, 1904, March was one of several Americans serving with the Imperial Japanese Army as military attachés and observers in the Russo-Japanese War. Of the seventeen military attachés observing both sides of the Russo-Japanese War for the United States, eight were later promoted to be generals.

In 1907, March commanded the 1st Battalion, 6th Field Artillery. March then served as adjutant of Fort Riley, Kansas and then served as adjutant at several other commands, including at the War Department.

In 1916, he was promoted to colonel and commanded the 8th Field Artillery Regiment on the Mexican border during the Pancho Villa Expedition.

== Later career ==
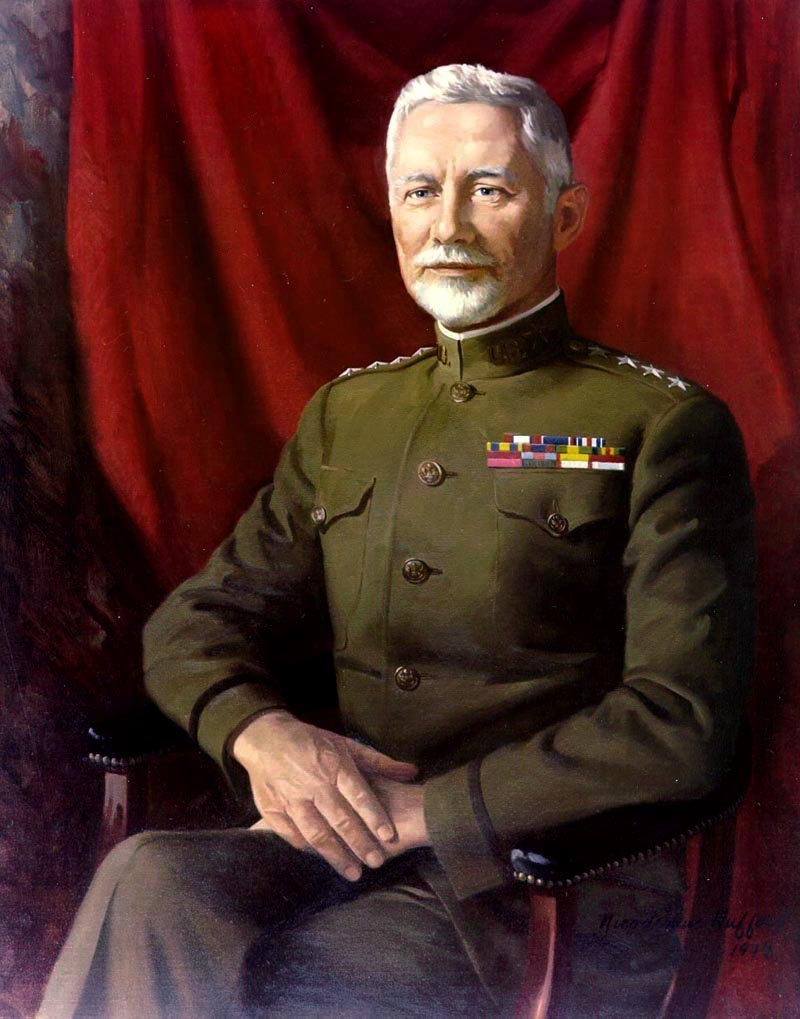
General March depicted in a portrait by Nicodemus David Hufford III

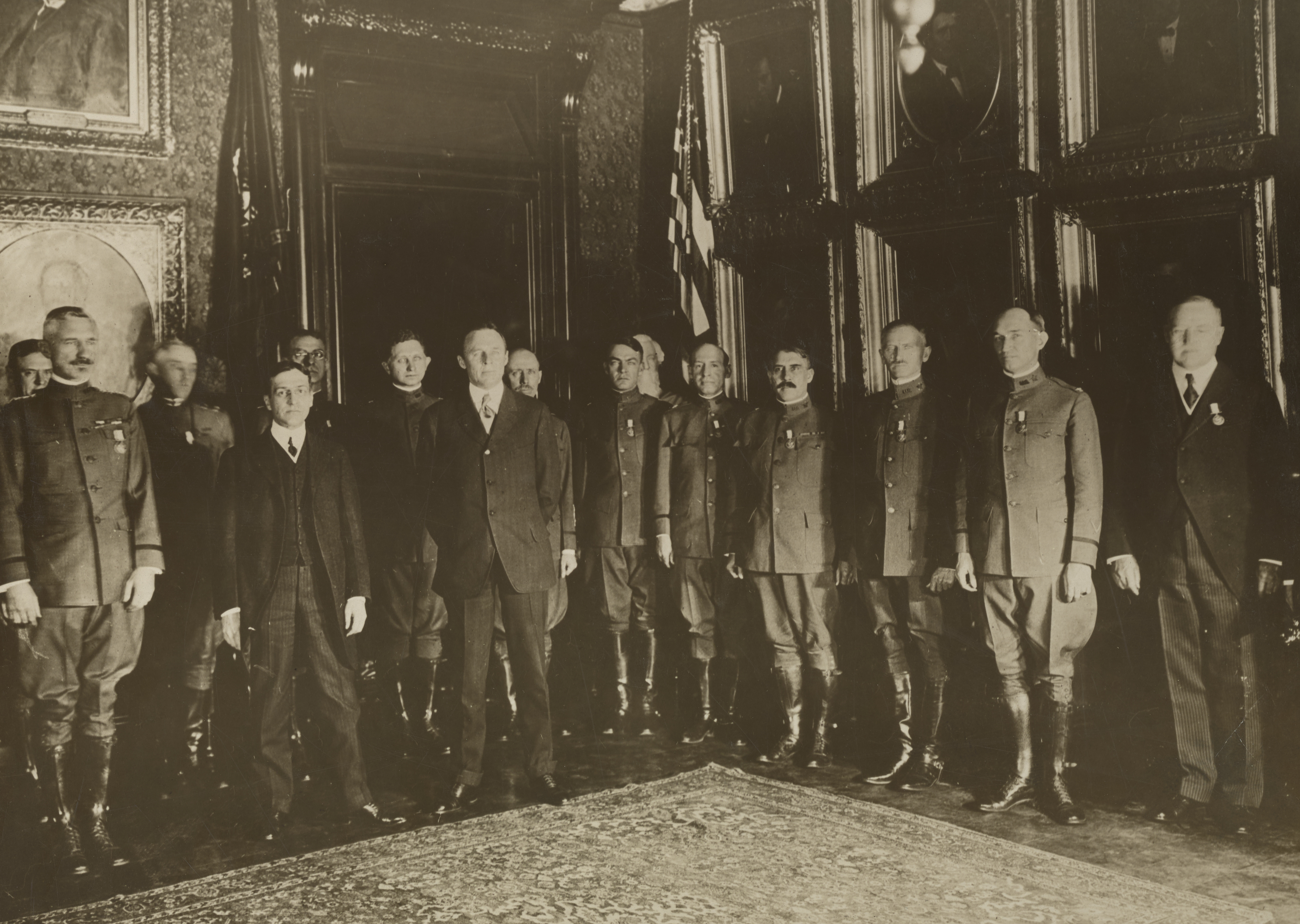
The Army Distinguished Service Medal presented by Secretary of War Newton D. Baker to several World War I generals, including March (far left, wearing his Army DSM), in January 1919

In June 1917, shortly after the American entry into World War I, March was promoted to brigadier general and commanded the 1st Field Artillery Brigade, 1st Division, American Expeditionary Forces (AEF) and, accompanied by First Lieutenant Stanley E. Reinhart (later a major general in World War II) as his aide-de-camp, went to France with the 1st Division. Later that year, March was promoted to major general and commanded the artillery units of the First Army and all non-divisional artillery units.

In March 1918, he was recalled to Washington. He ook over as acting Army Chief of Staff on March 4, and was named Army Chief of Staff on May 20, 1918. He was promoted to temporary full general. Joseph M. Swing (a lieutenant general in World War II) was his new aide-de-camp.

March was highly critical of President Wilson's decision to send an American expedition to North Russia and Siberia in 1918 during the Russian Civil War ostensibly to prop-up the White movement war effort, secure the railroads, support the Czech Legion trapped there, and stop the Japanese from exploiting the chaos in order to colonize Siberia. March wrote after the pull-out of American forces in 1920:

The sending of this expedition was the last occasion in which the president reversed the recommendation of the War Department during my service as Chief of Staff of the Army. ... almost immediately after the Siberian and North Russian forces had reached their theaters of operations, events moved rapidly and uniformly in the direction of complete failure of these expeditions to accomplish anything that their sponsors had claimed for them.

He served as chief of staff until June 30, 1921. As chief of staff he reorganized the Army structure, and abolished the distinctions between the Regular Army, the Army Reserves, and the National Guard during wartime. He created new technical branches in the service including the Air Service, Tank Corps, and Chemical Warfare Service. He also centralized control over supply. After the war ended, he supervised the demobilization of the Army. As chief of staff he often came into disagreement with General John J. Pershing, who wanted to conduct the AEF as an independent command. March was a highly efficient and capable administrator who did much to modernize the American Army and prepare it for combat in the First World War.

March retired as a major general in 1921 at the age of 56. He was furious that Pershing was made a permanent four-star general with the rank of General of the Armies of the United States, therefore outranking March, nominally Pershing's superior. In June 1930, March was advanced to general on the retired list as the result of a law which enabled World War I generals to retire at the highest rank they had held.

After retirement, he travelled Europe, Africa, and Turkey. In 1932, he published his war memoirs, The Nation at War. During World War II, reporters for Time and Life magazines regularly sought his opinions of events. He was a fan of the Washington Senators and regularly attended their home games.

== Personal life ==
March married Josephine Cunningham (née Smith, December 18, 1862 – November 18, 1904), the widowed daughter of his battery commander, Lieutenant Colonel Lewis Smith, on July 4, 1891. She died in November 1904, while March was still observing the Imperial Japanese Army. Between November 28, 1917, and June 8, 1918, their daughters Mildred (1893–1967), Josephine (1895–1972) and Vivian (1899–1932) had all married army officers, Josephine marrying March's aide-de-camp in World War I, Joseph M. Swing. Josephine had a twin brother, named Peyton Jr. who died ten days after their birth. March's second son, also named Peyton Jr., was killed in a plane crash in Texas during World War I. March AFB in Riverside, California, was named in his honor. A third son, Lewis Alden March, was born in 1904 and died in 1928.

While traveling in Italy, he met Cora Virginia McEntee (1897–1964), and married her in August 1923.

== Death ==
March died at the Walter Reed Army Medical Center in Washington, D.C., on April 13, 1955. He was buried at Arlington National Cemetery.

His funeral march included "the escort commander and his staff, the United States Army Band, one battalion of cadets from the U.S. Military Academy, one company of infantry, one battery of field artillery, one company of armor, the U.S. Marine Band, one company of Marines. one company of bluejackets, one squadron of airmen, and one composite company of servicewomen." The estimated total strength of the military escort was 1,200 soldiers, sailors, airmen, and Marines.

At his gravesite at Arlington National Cemetery "was a large group of military, civilian, and foreign dignitaries headed by Vice President Richard M. Nixon. Also in attendance were representatives of the Society of the Cincinnati, the descendants of the Signers of the Declaration of Independence, and the Delta Kappa Epsilon fraternity, to all of which General March had belonged."

== Awards and decorations ==

Distinguished Service Cross	Army Distinguished Service Medal	Silver Star with four oak leaf clusters

Spanish Campaign Medal	Philippine Campaign Medal	Mexican Border Service Medal	World War I Victory Medal
Honorary Knight Grand Cross of the Order of St Michael and St George (United Kingdom)	Grand Officier Légion d'honneur (France)	Grand Cross Order of Saints Maurice and Lazarus (Italy)	Grand Cordon Order of the Rising Sun (Japan)
Grand Cross Order of George I (Greece)	Grand Cross Order of the Crown (Belgium)	Grand Cross Order of Polonia Restituta (Poland)	WWI War Cross (Czechoslovakia)

== Dates of rank ==
Insignia	Rank	Component	Date
None	Cadet	United States Military Academy	June 15, 1884
None in 1888	Second Lieutenant	Regular Army	June 11, 1888
	First Lieutenant	Regular Army	March 25, 1894
	Major	Volunteers	July 5, 1899
	Lieutenant Colonel	Volunteers	June 9, 1900
	Captain	Regular Army	February 2, 1901 (Discharged from Volunteers on June 30, 1901.)
	Major	Regular Army	January 25, 1907
	Lieutenant Colonel	Regular Army	February 8, 1912
	Colonel	Regular Army	July 1, 1916
	Brigadier General	Regular Army	June 22, 1917 (Date of rank was June 17, 1917.)
	Major General	National Army	September 3, 1917 (Date of rank was August 5, 1917.)
	Major General	Regular Army	February 12, 1918 (Date of rank was September 23, 1917.)
	General	Emergency	May 25, 1918 (Date of rank was May 20, 1918.)
	Major General	Regular Army	July 1, 1920 (Reverted to permanent rank.)
	Major General	Retired List	November 1, 1921
	General	Retired List	June 21, 1930

Source: Army Register, 1946

== Honors ==
In 1919, March was admitted as an honorary member of the Virginia Society of the Cincinnati. In December 1922, he was elected honorary president of Delta Kappa Epsilon during the fraternity's 78th Annual Convention.

== Bibliography ==
- Coffman, Edward M. (1966). The Hilt of the Sword: The Career of Peyton C. March. Madison, Wisconsin: University of Wisconsin Press. OCLC 289059.
- Neumann, Brian (October 2009). "A Question of Authority: Reassessing the March-Pershing "Feud" in the First World War" (PDF). The Journal of Military History. 73 (4): 1117–1142. doi:10.1353/jmh.0.0374. S2CID 159714113. Archived from the original (PDF) on February 9, 2015.
- Fisher, Ann (February 5, 1973). Toward a Post World War I Military Policy: Peyton C. March vs. John McAuley Palmer (PDF). Carlisle Barracks, Pennsylvania: U.S. Army War College. Archived from the original (PDF) on May 18, 2015.
- Browne, B. F., Brigadier General, U.S. Army (Retired) U.S.M.A. 1901. "Peyton C. March, 1888". Memorials. West Point Association of Graduates. Archived from the original on February 6, 2018.
- Davis, Henry Blaine Jr. (1998). Generals in Khaki. Raleigh, North Carolina: Pentland Press. ISBN 1571970886. OCLC 40298151.

Military offices
Preceded by Tasker H. Bliss	Chief of Staff of the United States Army; 1918–1921	Succeeded by John J. Pershing
