= William V. Judson =

United States Army general

William Voorhees Judson
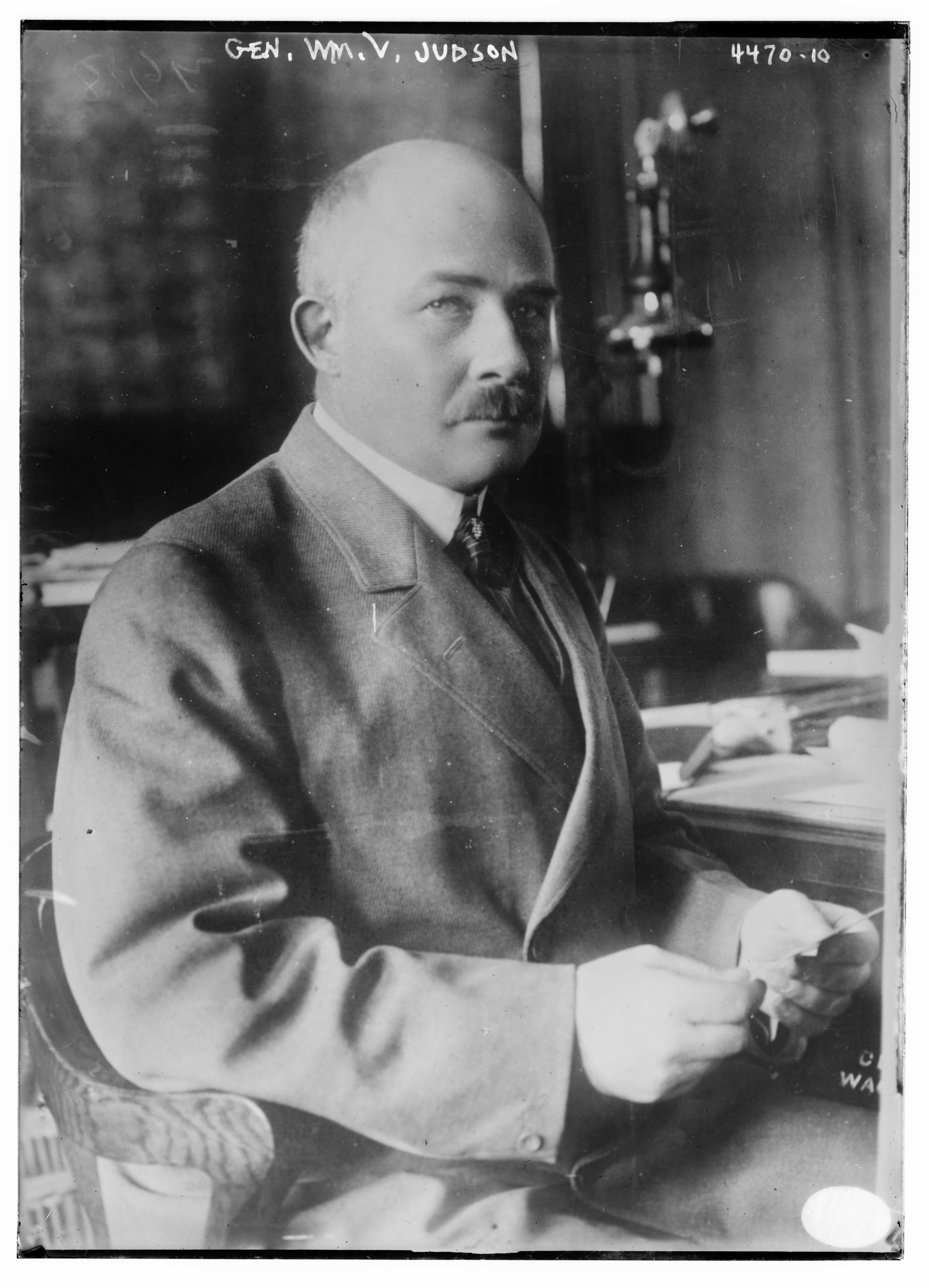
- Bain News Service, 1918. Library of Congress.
- Born: February 16, 1865; Indianapolis, Indiana, US
- Died: March 29, 1923 (aged 58); Winter Park, Florida, US
- Burial place: Arlington National Cemetery
- Military career
- Allegiance: United States of America
- Branch: United States Army
- Service years: 1888–1922
- Rank: Brigadier General
- Unit: 38th Infantry Division
- Conflicts: Russo-Japanese War; World War I Russian Civil War
- Awards: Army Distinguished Service Medal

Engineer Commissioner of the District of Columbia
- In office March 15, 1909 – February 28, 1913
- Preceded by: Spencer Cosby
- Succeeded by: Chester Harding

William Voorhees Judson (February 16, 1865 – March 29, 1923) was an American brigadier general, who served as a military aide with the Root Mission to the Russian Provisional Government.

== Early life and education ==
William Voorhees Judson was born to Charles E. Judson and Abby Cady Voorhees Judson in Indianapolis, Indiana, on the February 16, 1865. He attended Harvard University for two years before being admitted into the United States Military Academy, from which he graduated third in his class in 1888. James W. McAndrew, Peyton C. March, Robert Lee Howze, John Louis Hayden, Peter Charles Harris, Edward Anderson, William Robert Dashiell, William M. Morrow and Eli Alva Helmick were among his classmates who would, like Judson himself, ultimately attain general officer rank.

== Military career ==
Following his graduation from USMA, Judson then attended the Army Engineering School of Application, which he graduated from in 1891. Following that, he served as an assistant engineer in various postings; at Lake Erie, on the upper Mississippi River, and in Galveston, Texas. In July 1899, he was promoted to Chief Engineer and President of the Board of Public Works of Puerto Rico, where he served until August 1900.

Following that, Judson served in a variety of engineering capacities until 1917. Notable postings included that as an instructor at the U.S. Army Engineer School, as the Engineer Commissioner for Washington, D.C., and as the Assistant Division Engineer for the Atlantic side of the Panama Canal. Judson also was sent among the military attachés and observers in the Russo-Japanese War from 1904 to 1905, when he returned to the US as a result of the Russian defeat. From 1905 to 1909, he supervised maintenance and improvement of harbors and lighthouses on the western shore of Lake Michigan. In 1909, he was awarded a patent for a buoyant steel-reinforced concrete caisson for use in harbor construction. During this time, he also received an honorary M.A. from Harvard in 1911.

On April 6, 1917, the day of the American entry into World War I, Judson returned to Russia as part of Root Mission, headed by Elihu Root. Following Root's return to the U.S. three months later, Judson remained in Russia as head of the Root Mission itself before being detached as a military attaché to the American embassy in Petrograd and chief of the American military mission to Russia until Spring 1918. During this time, he conducted the first face-to-face meeting between a US diplomatic representative and a Bolshevik leader when he met with Leon Trotsky on December 1, 1918.

Upon his return, Judson was placed in command of the 38th Infantry Division at Camp Shelby until August 1918. From September to December 1918, Judson commanded the New York Port of Embarkation. For his services during the war he was awarded the Army Distinguished Service Medal, the citation for which reads:

The President of the United States of America, authorized by Act of Congress, July 9, 1918, takes pleasure in presenting the Army Distinguished Service Medal to Brigadier General William Voorhees Judson, United States Army, for exceptionally meritorious and distinguished services to the Government of the United States, in a duty of great responsibility during World War I, while serving as Chief of the American Military Mission to Russia and military attaché to the American embassy at Petrograd, Russia.

Judson spent the remainder of his career working as the district engineer in Chicago, Illinois, retiring in August 1922 due to disabilities.

== Personal life ==
Judson married Alice Carneal Clay in 1891. They had one son, Clay Judson.

== Death and legacy ==
Judson died on March 29, 1923. He is buried at Arlington National Cemetery with his wife. Judson wrote many letters and documents as a military attaché in Petrograd, which are considered to be of historical value. A book, Russia in War and Revolution: General William V. Judson's Accounts from Petrograd, 1917–1918 has been written on the basis of Judson's materials.
