= William H. Hart =

United States Army general (1864–1926)

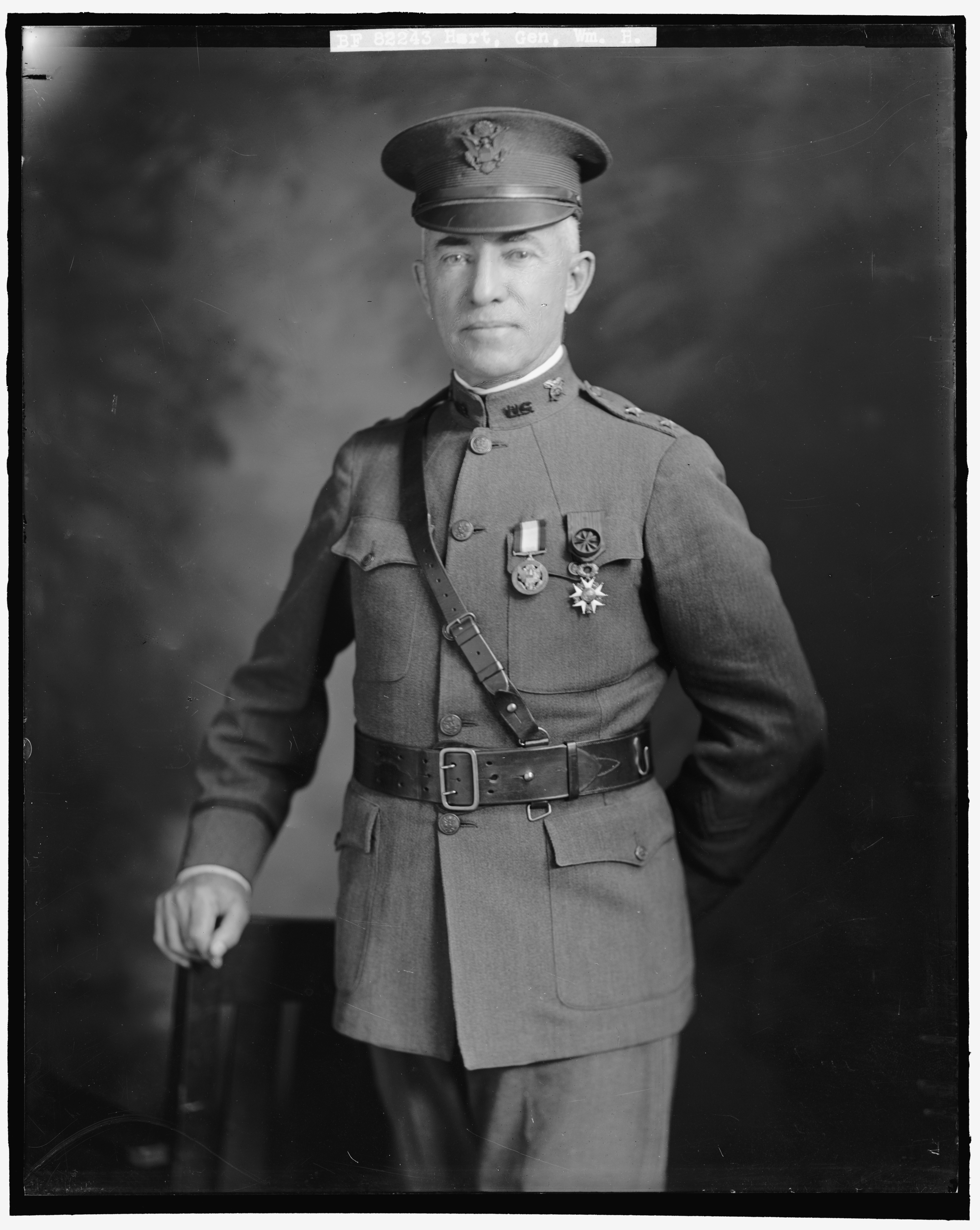
- Born: 20 March 1864; Minnesota
- Died: 2 January 1926 (aged 61); Washington, D.C., United States
- Burial place: Arlington National Cemetery, Virginia, United States
- Education: United States Military Academy
- Military career
- Allegiance: United States
- Branch: United States Army
- Service years: 1888–1926
- Rank: Major General
- Unit: Quartermaster Corps
- Commands: United States Army Quartermaster Corps
- Conflicts: Spanish-American War; Philippine–American War; World War I
- Awards: Army Distinguished Service Medal

William Horace Hart (20 March 1864 – 2 January 1926) was an American military officer who served as the Quartermaster General of the United States Army from 1922 to 1926.

Hart graduated from the United States Military Academy.

While serving as a colonel in the United States Army, he was appointed as Department Quartermaster at Fort Sam Houston in Texas.

He served as Quartermaster General of the United States Army from 1922 to 1926. During that time, he accepted a wreath and a United Daughters of the Confederacy Cross of Honor for World War Veterans at the Tomb of the Unknown Soldier in Arlington National Cemetery that were presented to him by President General Leonora St. George Rogers Schuyler.

He died in 1926.

Military offices
Preceded by Harry L. Rogers	Quartermaster General of the United States Army; 28 August 1922 – 2 January 1926	Succeeded by B. Frank Cheatham
