= Henry Jervey =

United States Army general (1866–1942)

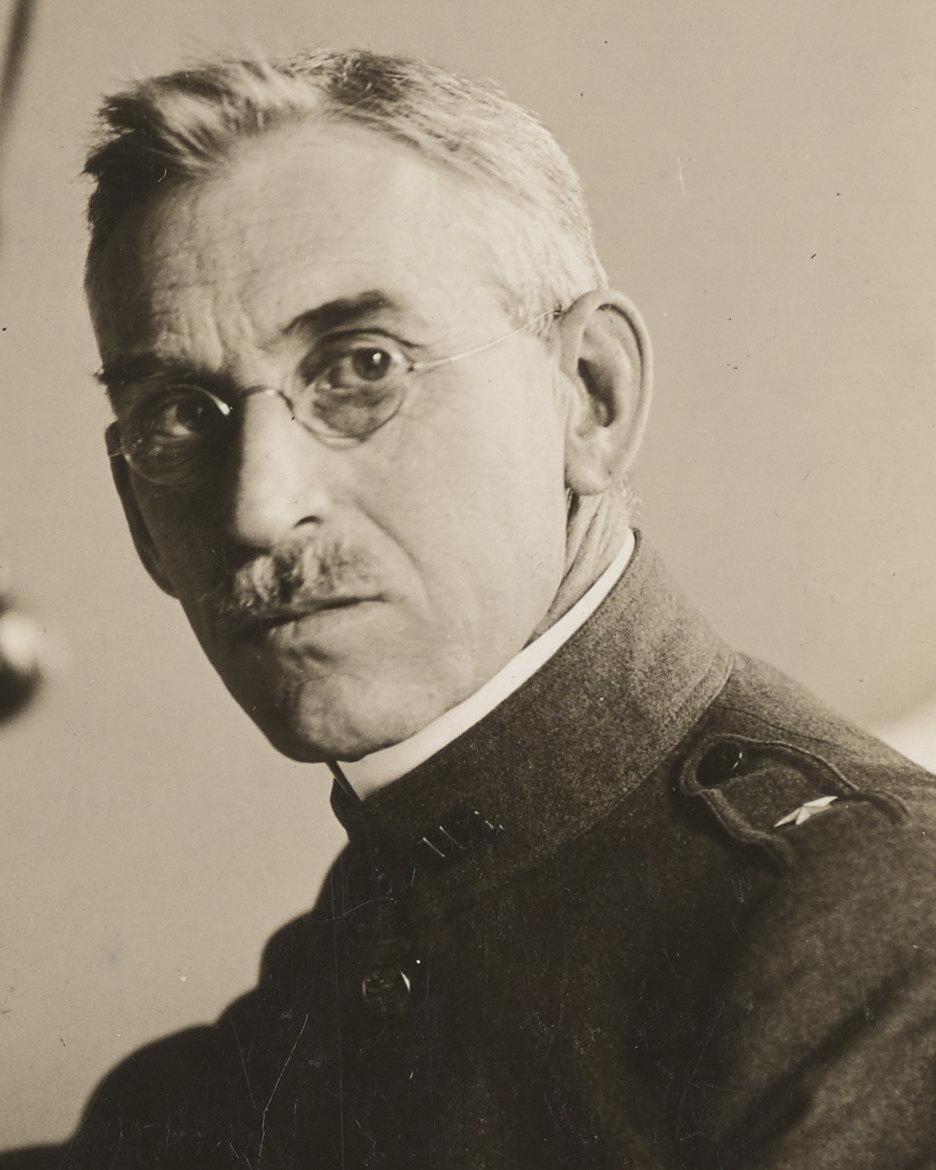
- Born: June 5, 1866; Dublin, Virginia
- Died: September 30, 1942 (aged 76); Charleston, South Carolina
- Burial place: Arlington National Cemetery
- Education: United States Military Academy
- Military career
- Allegiance: United States of America
- Branch: United States Army
- Service years: 1888–1922
- Rank: Major General
- Service number: 0-58
- Units: 11th Field Artillery Brigade; 41st Division (Acting); Engineer Officers' Training Camp; 6th Regiment of Engineers
- Wars: Philippine–American War; World War I
- Awards: Distinguished Service Medal; Companion of the Order of the Bath; Commander of the Legion of Honor; Grand Officer of the Order of Leopold; Member of the Order of the Crown

Henry Jervey (June 5, 1866 – September 30, 1942) was an officer in the United States Army who served as director, Operations Division, General Staff, during World War I. In 1917, he wrote the book Warfare of the Future. At the outbreak of World War I, Jervey was appointed brigadier general and served both as brigade and division commander. Later, he became assistant to General Peyton C. March, chief of staff in Washington. He was promoted to major general and made director, Operations Division, General Staff. He filled this position until September 1, 1921. Jervey was awarded the Distinguished Service Medal of the Army for his services as director of operations, General Staff. He also received foreign decorations from Great Britain, France, Italy and Belgium.

== Early life and education ==
Jervey was born in Dublin, Virginia, June 5, 1866, and was the oldest of the six sons of Dr. Henry Dickson Jervey, originally of Charleston, South Carolina, and Helen Louise Wesson Jervey of Summit Plantation, North Carolina. As a young man, Henry went to the home in Charleston of his uncle, Eugene Postell Jervey. Through his uncle's aid, he attended Charleston High School. Having completed his work at the Charleston school, he entered the University of the South at Sewanee, Tennessee, graduating in 1884 with the highest academic honors and with the degree of Civil Engineer. He later gained an appointment to the United States Military Academy from South Carolina in 1884, graduating first in the class of 1888.

== Military career ==
Three years after graduating from USMA, Jervey graduated from the Army Engineering School of Application. Following that, he worked in various civil engineering roles with the U.S. Army Corps of Engineers, improving the Mississippi River from 1898 to 1899, and managing rivers and harbors on the west coast of Florida from 1899 to 1900. From 1901 to 1903, Jervey served in the Philippines during the Philippine–American War in an undocumented capacity. Afterwards, he was an instructor at USMA from 1903 to 1905 and was promoted to major in October 1905. Jervey returned to engineering work in 1905, managing rivers, harbors, and defenses of the Mobile District. In 1910, he was assigned to river duty in Cincinnati. In February 1912, Jervey was promoted to lieutenant colonel. He returned to instruction in 1915, serving as a student, instructor and director at the Army War College until 1917. Jervey graduated from the War College in 1916.

In May 1917, after the American entry into World War I, Jervey was promoted to colonel and given command of the 6th Regiment of Engineers and the Engineer Officers' Training Camp at American University and Washington Barracks. In August 1917, he was promoted to brigadier general and assigned to the 66th Field Artillery Brigade, a unit in the 41st Division. Shortly after, Jervey became acting commander of the entire division from September 19, 1917, to December 12, 1917. In December 1917, he was moved to the War Department General Staff, where he was made director of operations (G-3) in February 1918. This led to his promotion to major general in October 1918. He was decorated with the Army Distinguished Service Medal for his service as director of operations. The citation for the medal reads:

The President of the United States of America, authorized by Act of Congress, July 9, 1918, takes pleasure in presenting the Army Distinguished Service Medal to Major General Henry Jervey, United States Army, for exceptionally meritorious and distinguished services to the Government of the United States, in a duty of great responsibility during World War I, as Director of Operations, General Staff, and as Assistant to the Chief of Staff in preparing and executing the plans involving the mobilization of personnel during the war.

Following the end of the war in November 1918, he was reverted to his previous rank of brigadier general and assumed command of the 11th Field Artillery Brigade in Hawaii. Jervey retired from the army on April 10, 1922.

During his service, he wrote one book, Warfare of the Future, which was published in 1917, prior to the U.S. entry into World War I and his promotion to brigadier general. In it, he states that the US would not be likely to send expeditionary forces to another country if drawn into a conflict with a "first-rate" power, a prediction that would be proven false only a few months later.

Jervey's major general rank was restored by an Act of Congress in June 1930.

== Personal life ==
Jervey was married twice; first to Katharine Erwin of Elkhart, Indiana, on November 14, 1895. Katharine died in 1929. To this marriage was born a son, William Wesson Jervey. Wesson Jervey would go on to graduate the United States Military Academy in 1919 and serve in the United States Army as a colonel in the Signal Corps. Henry's second wife, whom he married on March 19, 1930, was Henrietta Postell Jervey, daughter of Eugene Postell Jervey of Charleston, South Carolina.

== Death and legacy ==
Jervey died on September 30, 1942, in Charleston, South Carolina. He is buried in Arlington National Cemetery alongside his first wife and son.

After Jervey's death, General Peyton C. March, chief of staff, U.S. Army during the greater part of the first World War, wrote:—

"Henry Jervey was not only my classmate, but in later years my warm personal friend. When I returned from France in 1918 to become Chief of Staff of the Army, I found him serving on the General Staff. I made many changes in personnel, but Jervey stayed and became more and more valuable. As Chief of Operations, he had work of the most important character to do, and in spite of some physical weakness, he never missed a day,—and the days lasted until 12 o'clock at night, every day including Sunday. He had an unusually good mind, a wonderful devotion to duty, and gave all he had, every day, all day. My classmate friendship warmed into a rare affection for one of the finest characters as well as one of the ablest officers, with whom it was my good fortune to serve. He was so modest he never received the public notice his work deserved, and he passed on respected by all who knew him." (sig.) Peyton C. March, General.
