= William S. Peirce (United States Army officer) =

United States Army general

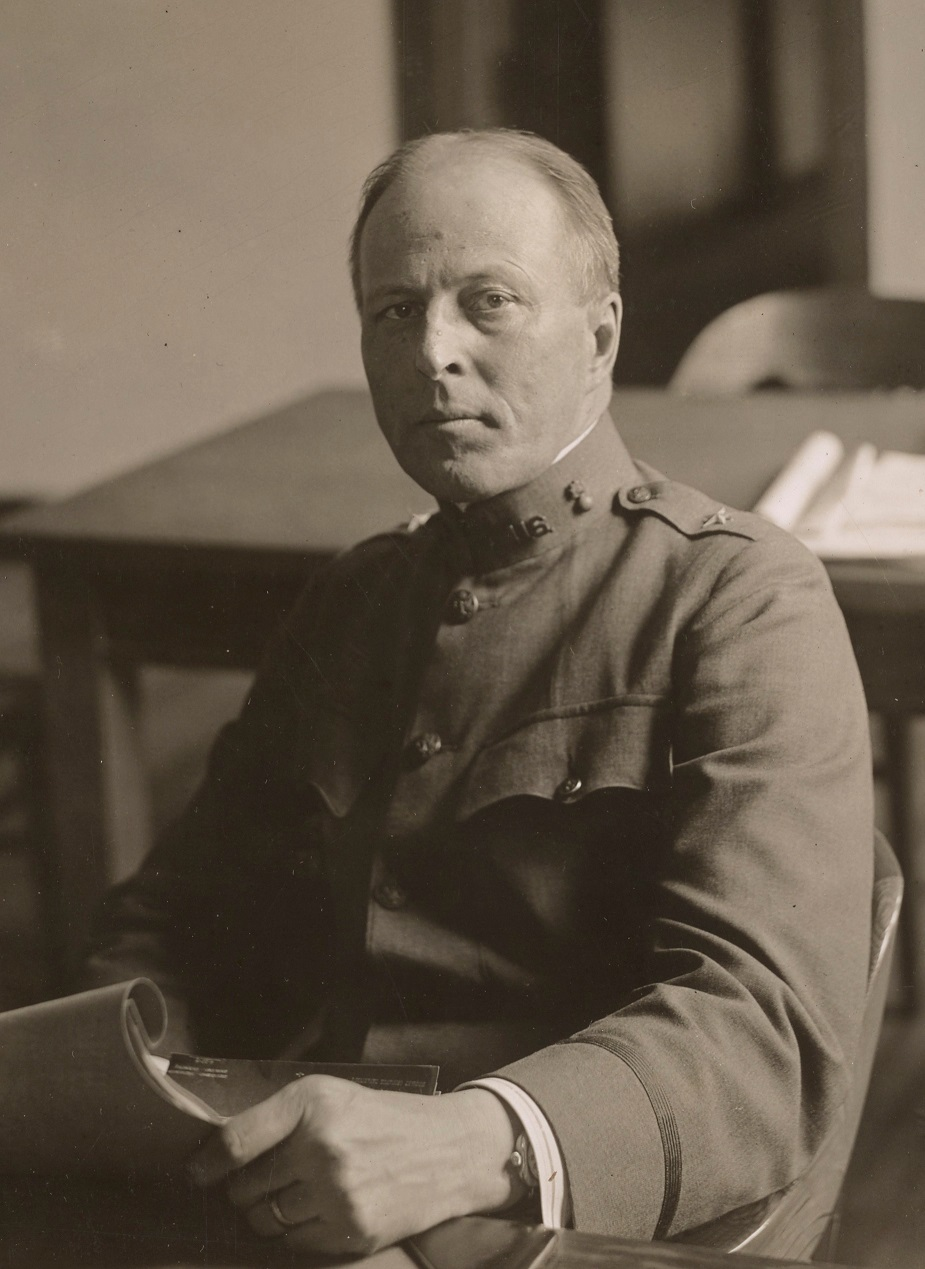
- Brigadier General William S. Peirce in Washington, April 1918
- Born: May 16, 1864; Burlington, Vermont
- Died: July 10, 1923 (aged 59); Washington, D.C.
- Burial place: Lakeview Cemetery, Burlington, Vermont
- Spouse(s): Lula Abercrombie (m. 1890, div. 1911); Harriet (Roberts) Peirce (m. 1911-1923, his death)
- Children: 4
- Military career
- Allegiance: United States
- Branch: United States Army
- Service years: 1888–1923
- Rank: Brigadier General
- Service number: 0-69
- Unit: U.S. Army Ordnance Corps
- Commands: Springfield Armory
- Conflicts: World War I
- Awards: Distinguished Service Medal

William Sullivan Peirce (May 16, 1864 – July 10, 1923) was a United States Army officer in the late 19th and early 20th centuries. In World War I, he commanded the Springfield Armory. He attained the rank of brigadier general, and after the war served as the Army's Assistant Chief of Ordnance.

== Biography ==
Peirce was born on May 16, 1864, in Burlington, Vermont. He studied at the University of Vermont from 1881 to 1884 and took part in the school's military instruction program, where he attained the rank of cadet sergeant major. He then began studies at the United States Military Academy. He graduated from West Point in 1888 ranked eighth of 44, and was appointed a second lieutenant of Field Artillery. In 1892 he was transferred to the Ordnance Department, serving at the Watervliet Arsenal, the Sandy Hook Proving Ground, the Rock Island Arsenal and the Springfield Arsenal.

In September 1912 he was put in charge of the Springfield Armory. After the American entry into World War I Peirce was transferred to Washington, D.C., where he was serving as chief of the Administration Division and assistant Chief of Ordnance. Peirce was promoted to brigadier general in 1918. Peirce received the Army Distinguished Service Medal in recognition of his wartime achievements.

== Death and burial ==
Peirce died at a Washington, D.C. hospital on July 10, 1923. He was buried at Lakeview Cemetery in Burlington, Vermont.

== Awards ==
Peirce received the Army Distinguished Service Medal for his actions during World War I, the citation for which reads:

The President of the United States of America, authorized by Act of Congress, July 9, 1918, takes pleasure in presenting the Army Distinguished Service Medal to Brigadier General William Sullivan Peirce, United States Army, for exceptionally meritorious and distinguished services to the Government of the United States, in a duty of great responsibility during World War I. While in charge of the Springfield Arsenal, Colonel Peirce's exceptional ability contributed materially to increasing the output of small arms. As Assistant Chief of Ordnance he has rendered conspicuous service.

In addition, Peirce was awarded the French Legion of Honor (Officer).

== Family ==
In 1890, Peirce married Lula Abercrombie of Pensacola, Florida. They were the parents of four children, Gladys, Marjorie, Albert, and Dorothy. They divorced in March 1911, and in April, Peirce married Harriet Roberts. They remained married until his death.

== Bibliography ==
- Davis, Henry Blaine Jr. (1998). Generals in Khaki. Raleigh, North Carolina: Pentland Press. ISBN 1571970886. OCLC 40298151.
