= Thomas Sullivan (Medal of Honor, 1890) =

- Born: April 4, 1859; Ireland, County Meath
- Died: January 10, 1940 (aged 80); New York City, New York, U.S.
- Burial place: East Orange, New Jersey
- Military career
- Allegiance: United States of America
- Branch: United States Army
- Rank: Private
- Unit: E Co. 7th U.S. Cavalry
- Awards: Medal of Honor

Thomas Sullivan (April 4, 1859 – January 10, 1940) was a United States Army soldier and a recipient of America's highest military decoration—the Medal of Honor—for his actions in the Battle of Wounded Knee, (Note: According to the US Army, two Thomas Sullivans received Medals of Honor during the Indian War period. This article is about the Irish born Sullivan who received the award for serving with the 7th Cavalry at Wounded Knee. See Thomas Sullivan (Medal of Honor, 1869) for the Kentucky born PVT Sullivan who received the award for serving with the 1ST Cavalry in the Chiricahua Mountains.) but now called the Wounded Knee Massacre.

== Biography ==
Thomas Sullivan was born in County Meath, Ireland, most likely to either Patrick Sullivan and Bridget Conolly, or Richard Sullivan and Mary McCann, based on available baptism records. (Note: Sources provide differing dates for his birth, making it difficult to match his birth to baptismal records with a high degree of certainty.) At age 28 he immigrated to the US and enlisted in the US Army at 28 years and five months age. His listed occupation on his enlistment documentation was a "laborer".

Sullivan was immediately assigned to Troop E 7th Cavalry and served four total enlistments with the unit. Afterward, for his fifth enlistment, he transferred to Troop H 2d Cavalry. There he served as quartermaster sergeant. Sullivan would go on to serve in both Cuba and the Philippines as part of the Spanish–American War before retiring from Ft. Bliss as a First Sergeant with 23 years total in the Army.

Following his retirement Sullivan returned to New Jersey, married a woman named Ellen, another naturalized Irish immigrant, and worked intermittently as a watchman, guard, and policeman. He died in 1940 and was buried in the Holy Sepulchre Cemetery along with his wife who had died six years earlier.

== Wounded Knee ==
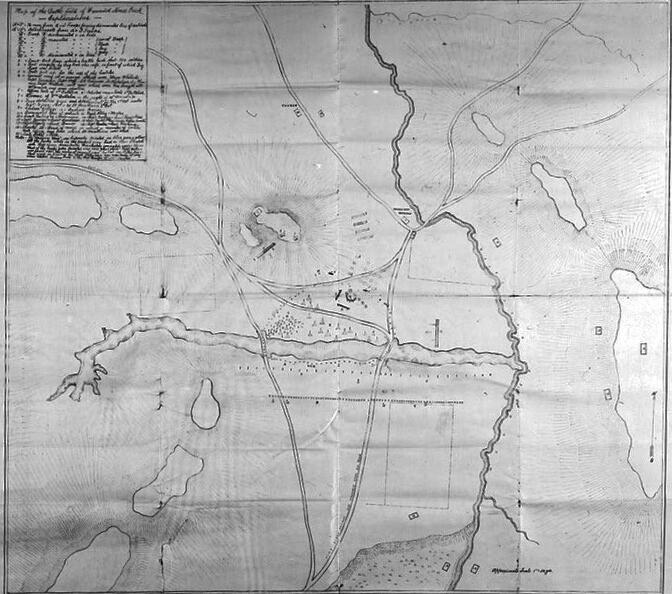
Map of Wounded Knee

The Battle of Wounded Knee (also Massacre of Wounded Knee) took place in December 1890. The 7th Cavalry Detachment had been escorting approximately 350 Lakota to the Pine Ridge Reservation when on December 29, the decision was made to disarm the tribe members. A scuffle ensued which quickly evolved into all-out hostilities, with the 7th Cavalry enjoying a significant tactical advantage, having superior numbers of fighting men as well as superior arms, including four Hotchkiss 1.65 inch M-1875 Mountain Guns.

This same day, E Troop 7th Cavalry began taking direct fire from Lakota who had concealed themselves in a ravine. After suffering three casualties, two of whom were killed, the call was put out for volunteers to maneuver from the current pinned-down position and attempt to gain a better vantage point. Sullivan volunteered to move left of the main body to an exposed position in an attempt to eliminate the threat. He and his fellow soldiers, Private Kellner and Sergeant Tritle, drew the enemy fire to their own position, providing relief for the main body.

== Awards and decorations ==

1st Row	Medal of Honor	Indian Campaign Medal	Philippine Campaign Medal
2nd Row	Spanish War Service Medal	Army of Cuban Occupation Medal	Mexican Border Service Medal

=== Medal of Honor Citation ===
The President of the United States of America, in the name of Congress, takes pleasure in presenting the Medal of Honor to Private Thomas Sullivan, United States Army, for conspicuous bravery in action against Indians concealed in a ravine on 29 December 1890, while serving with Company E, 7th U.S. Cavalry, in action at Wounded Knee Creek, South Dakota.

The reverse side of the medal is engraved with the following: "The Congress to Private Thomas Sullivan, Troop E, 7th Cavalry, for bravery at Wounded Knee Creek, S.D., December 29, 1890."

== Controversy ==
Mass Grave for the Dead Lakota After the Engagement at Wounded Knee

There have been several attempts by various parties to rescind the Medals of Honor awarded in connection with the Wounded Knee Massacre. Proponents claim that the engagement was in-fact a massacre and not a battle, due to the high number of killed and wounded Lakota women and children and the very one-sided casualty counts. Estimates of the Lakota losses indicate 150–300 killed, of which up to 200 were women and children. Additionally, as many as 51 were wounded. In contrast, the 7th Cavalry suffered 25 killed and 39 wounded, many being the result of friendly fire.

Calvin Spotted Elk, direct descendant of Chief Spotted Elk killed at Wounded Knee, launched a petition to rescind medals from the soldiers who participated in the battle.

The Army has also been criticized more generally for the seemingly disproportionate number of Medals of Honor awarded in connection with the battle. For comparison, 19 Medals were awarded at Wounded Knee, 21 at the Battle of Cedar Creek, and 20 at the Battle of Antietam. Respectively, Cedar Creek and Antietam involved 52,712 and 113,000 troops, suffering 8,674 and 22,717 casualties. Wounded Knee, however, involved 610 combatants and resulted in as many as 705 casualties (including non-combatants).

== See also ==
- List of Medal of Honor recipients
- List of Medal of Honor recipients for the Indian Wars
- American Indian Wars
