= John Louis Hayden =

United States Army general (1866–1936)

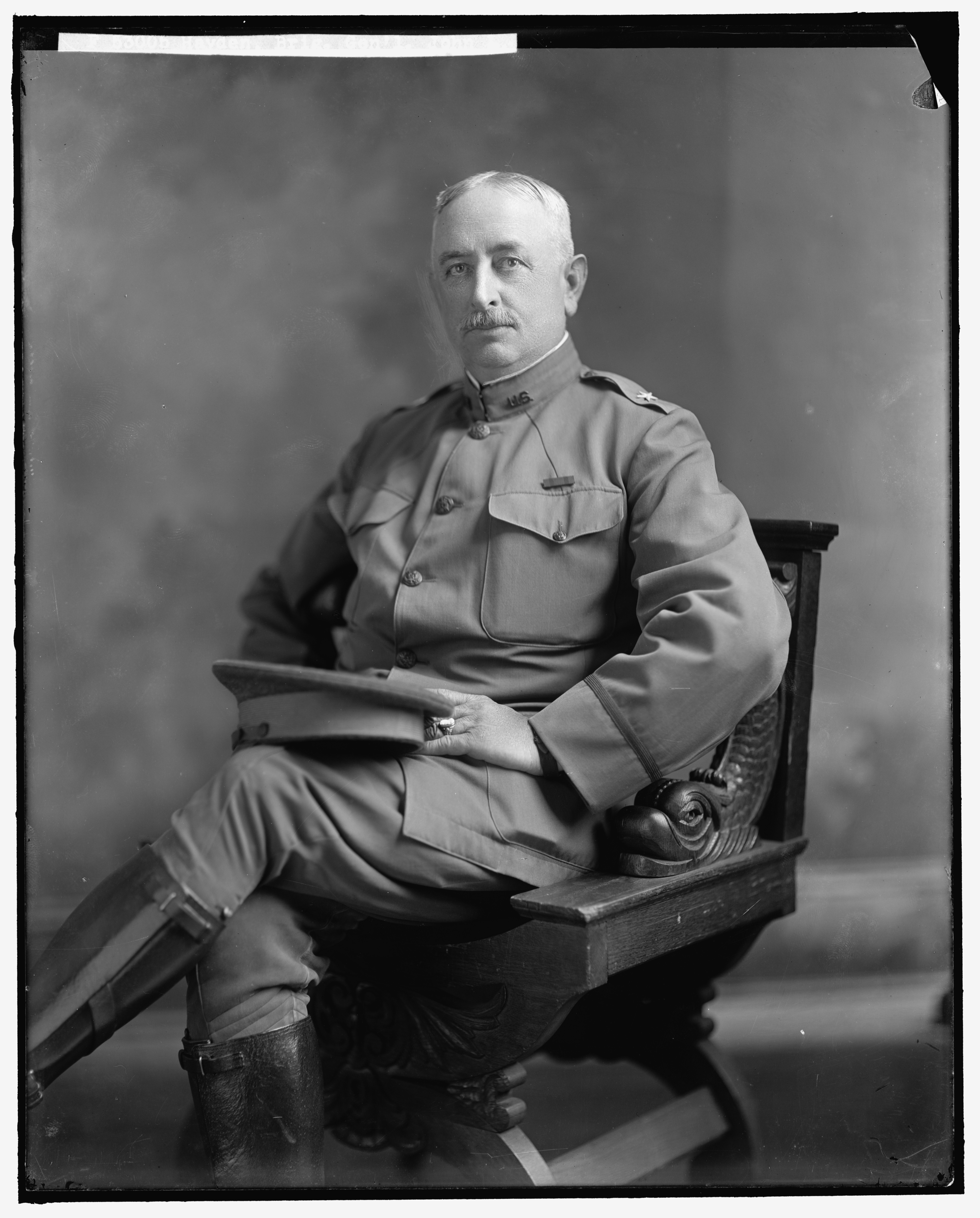
- Hayden, 1905–1936
- Born: November 2, 1866; Chicago, Illinois
- Died: February 22, 1936 (aged 69); Port Townsend, Washington
- Spouse: Myra Lord
- Children: 2
- Military career
- Allegiance: United States
- Branch: United States Army
- Service years: 1888–1922
- Rank: Brigadier general
- Service number: 0-169
- Conflicts: Ghost Dance War • Wounded Knee Massacre • Drexel Mission Fight; World War I

John Louis Hayden (November 2, 1866 – February 22, 1936) was a United States Army officer in the late 19th and early 20th centuries. He served in several conflicts, including World War I.

== Biography ==
Hayden was born in Chicago in 1866. His father was an American Civil War veteran who served in the 19th Illinois Volunteer Infantry. Hayden graduated, 6th in a class of 44, from the United States Military Academy in 1888.

Hayden was commissioned into the First Artillery, and he served at various locations, including at the Presidio of San Francisco, Fort Canby, Fort Columbus, and Fort Riley. From the latter location, Hayden was detached to serve in the Ghost Dance War in command of the Hotchkiss revolving cannon. He participated in the Battle of Wounded Knee and the Drexel Mission Fight, and because of his actions in the latter battle, Major Guy Vernor Henry recommended him for brevet promotion, something that General Nelson A. Miles concurred with. Hayden served as a professor of Military Science and Tactics at the University of Washington from 1892 to 1896.

Hayden was promoted to the rank of brigadier general on August 5, 1917, and in September, he commanded the 56th Field Artillery Brigade. From September 18, 1917, to March 15, 1918, Hayden temporarily commanded the 31st Division.

He then commanded U.S. forces in Seattle during the Seattle General Strike in February 1919, with his performance being praised from across the political spectrum.

Hayden retired in 1922, and he lived the remainder of his life in Port Townsend, Washington. Congress restored his brigadier general rank in June 1930. He died on February 22, 1936, at the age of 69.

== Personal life ==
Hayden married Myra Lord on June 6, 1894, and they had two sons together, both of them becoming U.S. Army officers. Hayden's wife died on December 11, 1918.

== Bibliography ==
- Davis, Henry Blaine Jr. (1998). Generals in Khaki. Raleigh, North Carolina: Pentland Press. ISBN 1571970886. OCLC 40298151.
- Marquis Who's Who (1975). Who Was Who In American History – The Military. Chicago, Illinois: Marquis Who's Who. ISBN 0837932017.
