= Thomas Quinton Donaldson Jr. =

United States Army Major General

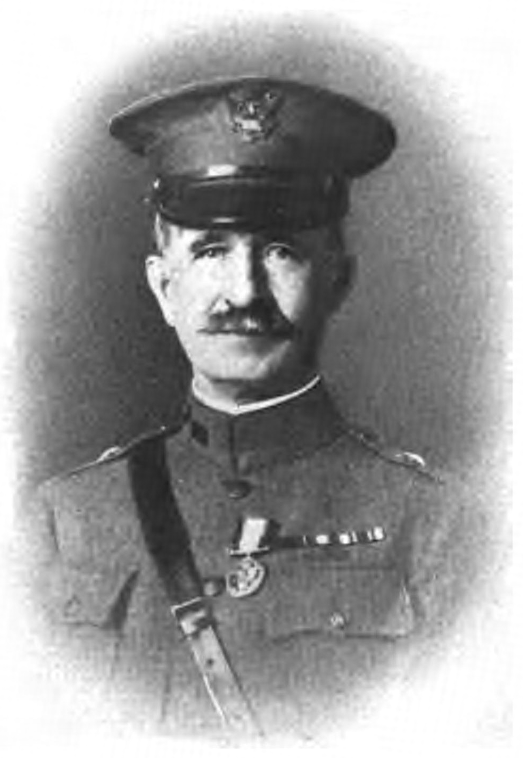
- Born: June 26, 1864; Greenville, South Carolina
- Died: October 26, 1934 (aged 70); New York, New York
- Burial place: Arlington National Cemetery
- Education: United States Military Academy
- Occupation: Military officer
- Spouse: Mary Elizabeth Willson (m. 1892)
- Children: 4

Signature
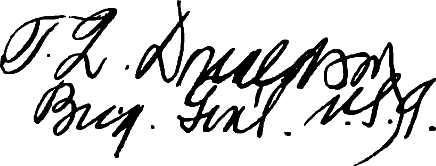

Thomas Quinton Donaldson Jr. (1864–1934) was a United States Army Major General, who was a veteran of numerous American Indian Wars, including the Wounded Knee Massacre. His final command was Fort Sam Houston, Texas.

== Early life ==
Donaldson was born into a military family at Greenville, South Carolina on June 26, 1864. After basic education through local schools, he enrolled at Patrick Military Institute. In June 1887, he graduated 34th in a class of 64 from the United States Military Academy (USMA) at West Point, New York.

He married Mary Elizabeth Willson in 1892, and they had four children.

== Wounded Knee and Indian wars ==
Donaldson was a veteran of the American Indian Wars, having served in the 7th Cavalry Regiment under James W. Forsyth during the 1890 South Dakota Wounded Knee Massacre, and the ensuing White Clay Creek massacre. Donaldson subsequently provided a multi-page hand-written account of the battle at Wounded Knee.

== Later military service ==
He was a veteran of the 1898 Spanish–American War, and saw World War I service at Governors Island in New York, as well as at Tours, France. In 1920, he was made a colonel of the Inspector General's Department, during the pursuit of draft dodger Grover Cleveland Bergdoll who was later arrested for evading Article 58 of the Selective Service Act of 1917.

== Final years ==
Donaldson was put in charge of Fort Sam Houston in San Antonio, Texas in 1928. Due to his ill health, he was replaced the same year by Major General William Lassiter. He relocated to New York, where he died on October 26, 1934. He was buried at Arlington National Cemetery.

== See also ==
- Pershing House
