= The Indian Wars Refought =

1914 film

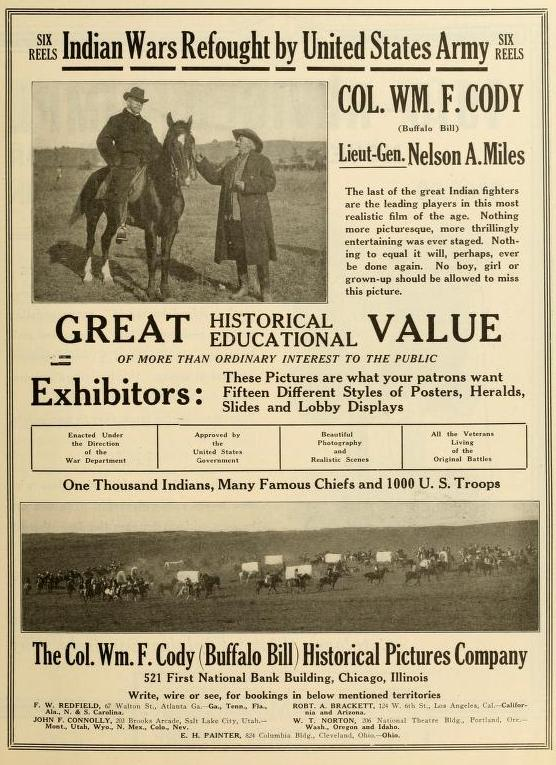
- Theatrical release poster
- Directed by: Theodore Wharton
- Screenplay by: Charles King
- Starring: William F. Cody; Nelson Appleton Miles; Charles King
- Cinematography: D. T. Hargan
- Production companies: Buffalo Bill Historical Picture Company; Essanay Film Mfg. Co.
- Distributed by: State Rights
- Release date: August 1914
- Running time: 5 reels
- Country: United States
- Languages: Silent; English intertitles

The Indian Wars Refought is a 1914 American silent Western film that depicts several historical battles of The Indian Wars. The film was directed by Theodore Wharton and stars William F. Cody, Nelson Appleton Miles and Charles King, all of whom participated in the actual battles depicted in the movie. The feature was produced by the Buffalo Bill Historical Picture Company and Essanay Film Mfg. Company. The film was released in August 1914, but according to modern sources, it only played in Denver and New York City because of pressure from the government, which disapproved of its content because it showed the Indians in a somewhat favorable light. It is now considered a lost film.

According to news sources from 1917, the original film was titled Wars of Civilization, but other alternate titles for the feature include: The Last Indian Battles, From the Warpath to the Peace Pipe, The Wars for Civilization in America, Buffalo Bill's Indian Wars and Indian War Pictures.

== Synopsis ==
The film recreates four battles – the Battle of Summit Springs, the Battle of Warbonnet Creek, the Battle of the Mission and the Battle of Wounded Knee – which were fought by the United States Cavalry and various tribes of the Sioux Indians. The movie also features re-enactments of the Campaign of the Ghost Dance or Messiah Craze War, and the capture of Chief Big Foot. The feature also depicted Indian war dances, burning of camps and tepees, horse rustling and scalping. The end of the picture included scenes of Indian children attending modern schools and Indian farmers bringing in their crops.

== Cast ==
- William F. Cody
- Nelson Appleton Miles
- Jesse M. Lee
- Frank D. Baldwin
- Marion P. Maus
- Charles King
- H. G. Sickles
- Short Bull
- Dewey Beard

== Production and background ==
William F. Cody (Buffalo Bill) approached Secretary of War Lindley M. Garrison and Secretary of the Interior Franklin K. Lane about making this film. Garrison supplied Cody with the necessary troops from the 12th U. S. Cavalry and Lane authorized the participation of over 1,000 Sioux Indians. Lieutenant General Nelson Appleton Miles was hired as a technical consultant to make sure that the re-enactments were as accurate as possible, and was a cast member as well. Colonel H. G. Sickles and Charles King recreated their parts in the original battles of Wounded Knee and Warbonnet Creek, respectively. The film was shot at the sites of the original battles between September 1913 and November 1913 in the Bad Lands of South Dakota and the Black Hills of Wyoming. On February 27, 1914, the film was screened for Secretary Lane and other members of Woodrow Wilson's cabinet. After Cody's death in 1917, footage from the film was used in The Adventures of Buffalo Bill, a tribute to the late Cody.
