= Ghost shirt =

Historic Indigenous religious clothing

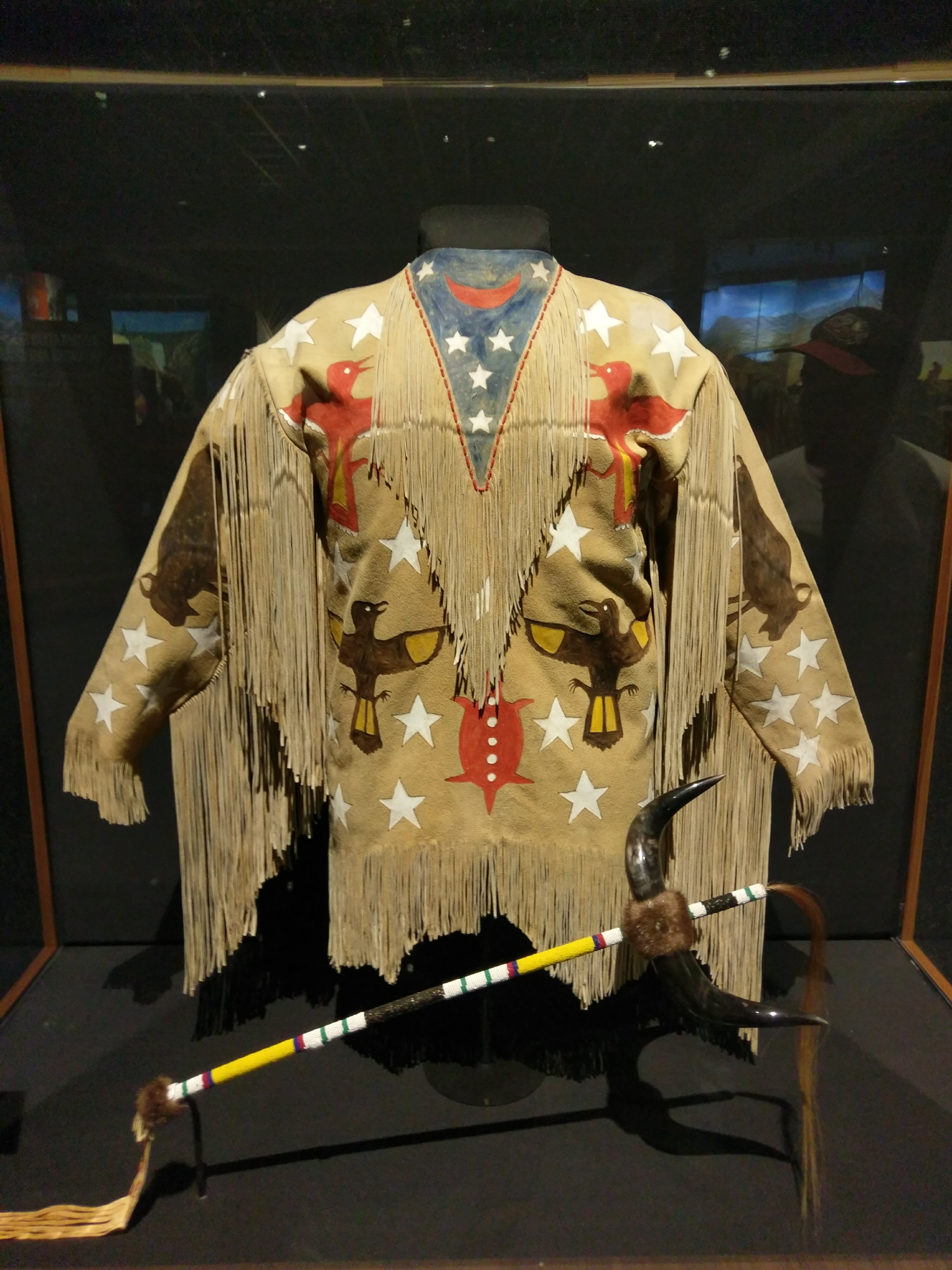
An Arapaho buckskin ghost shirt, ca 1890

Ghost shirts are shirts, or other clothing items, worn by members of the Ghost Dance religion, and thought to be imbued with spiritual powers. The religion was founded by Wovoka (Jack Wilson), a Northern Paiute Native American, in the late 19th century and quickly spread throughout the Indigenous peoples of the Great Basin and Plains tribes.

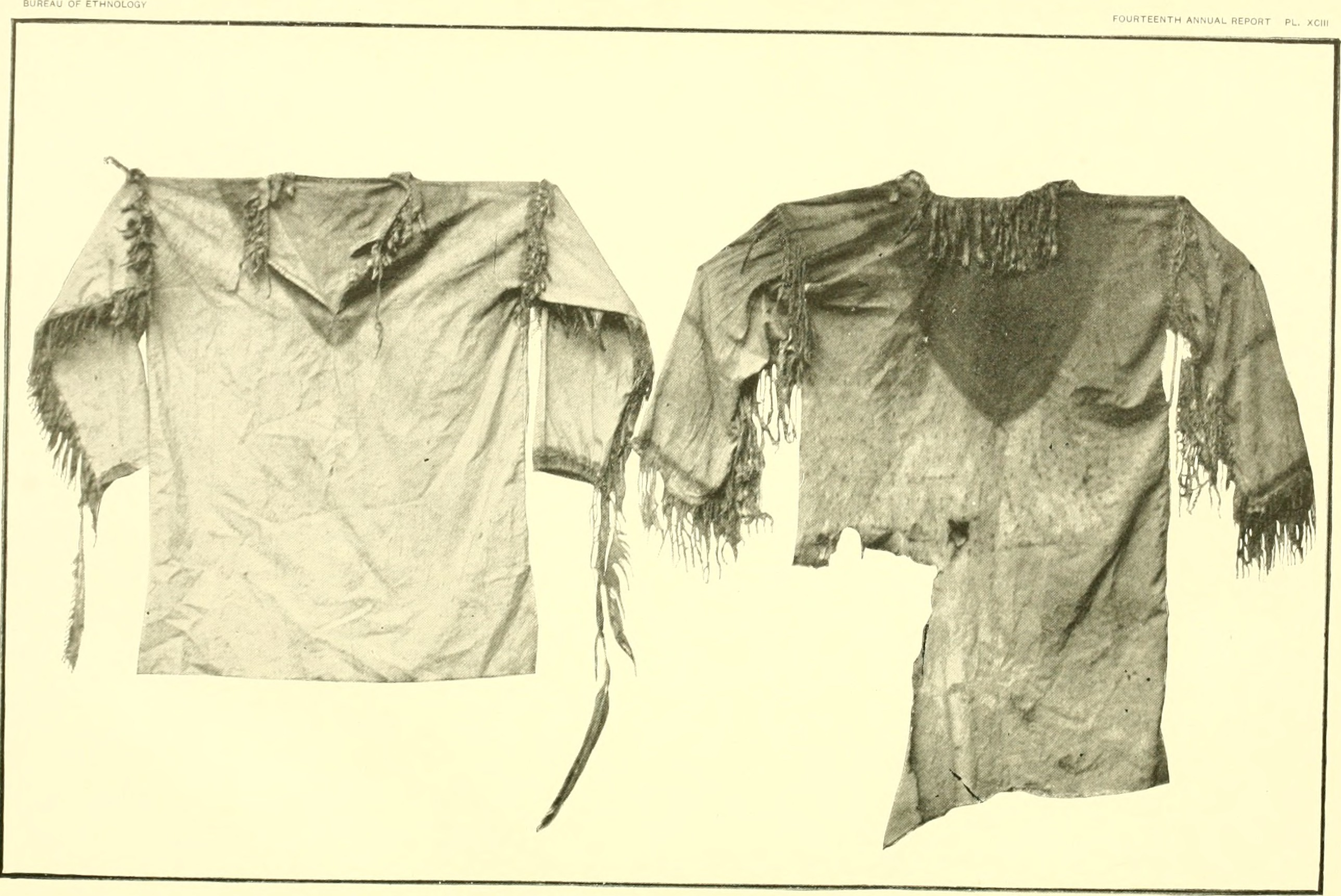
Sioux Ghost Shirts from Wounded Knee Battlefield

Ghost shirts, sacred to certain factions of Lakota people, were thought to guard against bullets through spiritual power. Wovoka opposed open rebellion against the white settlers. He believed that through pacificism, the Lakota and the rest of the Native Americans would be delivered from white oppression in the form of earthquakes. However, two Lakota warriors and followers of Wovoka, Kicking Bear and Short Bull, thought otherwise, and believed that Ghost shirts would protect the wearer enough to actively resist U.S. military aggression. The shirts did not work as promised, and when the U.S. Army attacked, 153 Lakota died, with 50 wounded and 150 missing at the Wounded Knee Massacre in 1890.

Anthropologist James Mooney argued that the most likely source of the belief that ghost shirts could repel bullets is the Mormon temple garment (which Mormons believe protects the pious wearer from evil, though not bullets). Scholars believe that in 1890 chief Kicking Bear introduced the concept to his people, the Lakota.

== Popular culture ==
In Kurt Vonnegut's novel Player Piano, a faction revolting against the rigidly hierarchical, mechanized United States of the future calls itself the Ghost Shirt Society. The founders claim that, like the militant Native Americans of the late 19th century, they are "mak[ing] one last fight for the old values".

In the 2023 film Americana, a modern-day Western crime thriller, the theft of an extremely valuable Lakota Ghost shirt sets in motion the actions and interactions of many characters, including a small armed Native American activist group.

== See also ==
- The Ghost Shirt, a ghost shirt returned to the Lakota by Glasgow City Council in 1998
- The followers of the Chinese Boxer Rebellion (1899–1901) claimed that the spirits protected them from bullets.
- Detente bala, an inscription used by Spanish soldiers from the 18th century onwards as a protection from bullets.
- Talismanic shirt – Shirt functioning as a talisman in Islamic culture
- Maori adherents to Pai Mārire believed making an exclamation would make them impervious to bullets.
