= The Aberdeen Saturday Pioneer =

Defunct weekly newspaper based in South Dakota (1890–1891)

- Type: Weekly newspaper
- Owner: L. Frank Baum
- Founder: L. Frank Baum
- Publisher: L. Frank Baum
- Editor-in-chief: L. Frank Baum
- Founded: January 25, 1890; 136 years ago
- Ceased publication: March 21, 1891; 135 years ago
- Language: English-language
- Headquarters: Aberdeen, South Dakota

The Aberdeen Saturday Pioneer was a weekly newspaper edited and published by L. Frank Baum (of The Wizard of Oz fame) between 1890 and 1891. Originally the The Dakota Pioneer founded by John H. Drake, was purchased by Baum from Drake and rebranded as The Aberdeen Saturday Pioneer. with the first issue of the weekly appearing on January 25, 1890, and the paper was based in Aberdeen, South Dakota.

== Editorial views ==
The Pioneer presented Baum's views on politics, suffrage, tolerance, and religion, providing an important key for deciphering the themes which would later appear in his fictional works, especially his fourteen Oz books. Baum strongly supported women's suffrage, and his editorials also discussed theosophical religious beliefs. In his column titled Our Landlady, Baum published satirical and humorous views of the Dakota region, introducing a fictitious boarding house keeper with strong political views named Sairy Ann Bilkins in the first issue.

== Calling for the genocide of the Lakota ==
Baum published two editorials on Native Americans on The Pioneer on December 20, 1890, and January 3, 1891, which have since attracted controversy due to their strong advocacy of racial genocide. In the first, Baum comments on the passing of Lakota leader Sitting Bull, expressing some sympathy for his actions: "He was an Indian with a white man's spirit of hatred and revenge for those who had wronged him and his. In his day he saw his son and his tribe gradually driven from their possessions: forced to give up their old hunting grounds and espouse the hard working and uncongenial avocations of the whites. And these, his conquerors, were marked in their dealings with his people by selfishness, falsehood and treachery. What wonder that his wild nature, untamed by years of subjection, should still revolt? What wonder that a fiery rage still burned within his breast and that he should seek every opportunity of obtaining vengeance upon his natural enemies." He brands Sitting Bull as the last of "the nobility of the Redskin" while describing the remaining Natives as "a pack of whining curs who lick the hand that smites them." He concludes the editorial by arguing for the extermination of Native American peoples: "The Whites," Baum wrote, "by law of conquest, by justice of civilization, are masters of the American continent, and the best safety of the frontier settlements will be secured by the total annihilation of the few remaining Indians. Why not annihilation?"

In the second editorial of January 3, 1891, pertaining to the Wounded Knee massacre, he argues “Having wronged them for centuries we had better, in order to protect our civilization, follow it up by one more wrong and wipe these untamed and untamable creatures from the face of the earth. In this lies future safety for our settlers and the soldiers who are under incompetent commands. Otherwise, we may expect future years to be as full of trouble with the redskins as those have been in the past. An eastern contemporary, with a grain of wisdom in its wit, says that "when the whites win a fight, it is a victory, and when the Indians win it, it is a massacre.""

Some commenters have argued Baum's views elsewhere display greater nuance with regard to the plight of Native Americans, particularly in his later children's novel The Wonderful Wizard of Oz published a decade later, containing allegorical references to the treatment of Native peoples.

== Financial problems ==
Due to financial problems the paper ceased publication, with the final issue of The Pioneer being published on March 21, 1891.
