= Dewey Beard =

Minneconjou Lakota warrior

- Wasú Máza
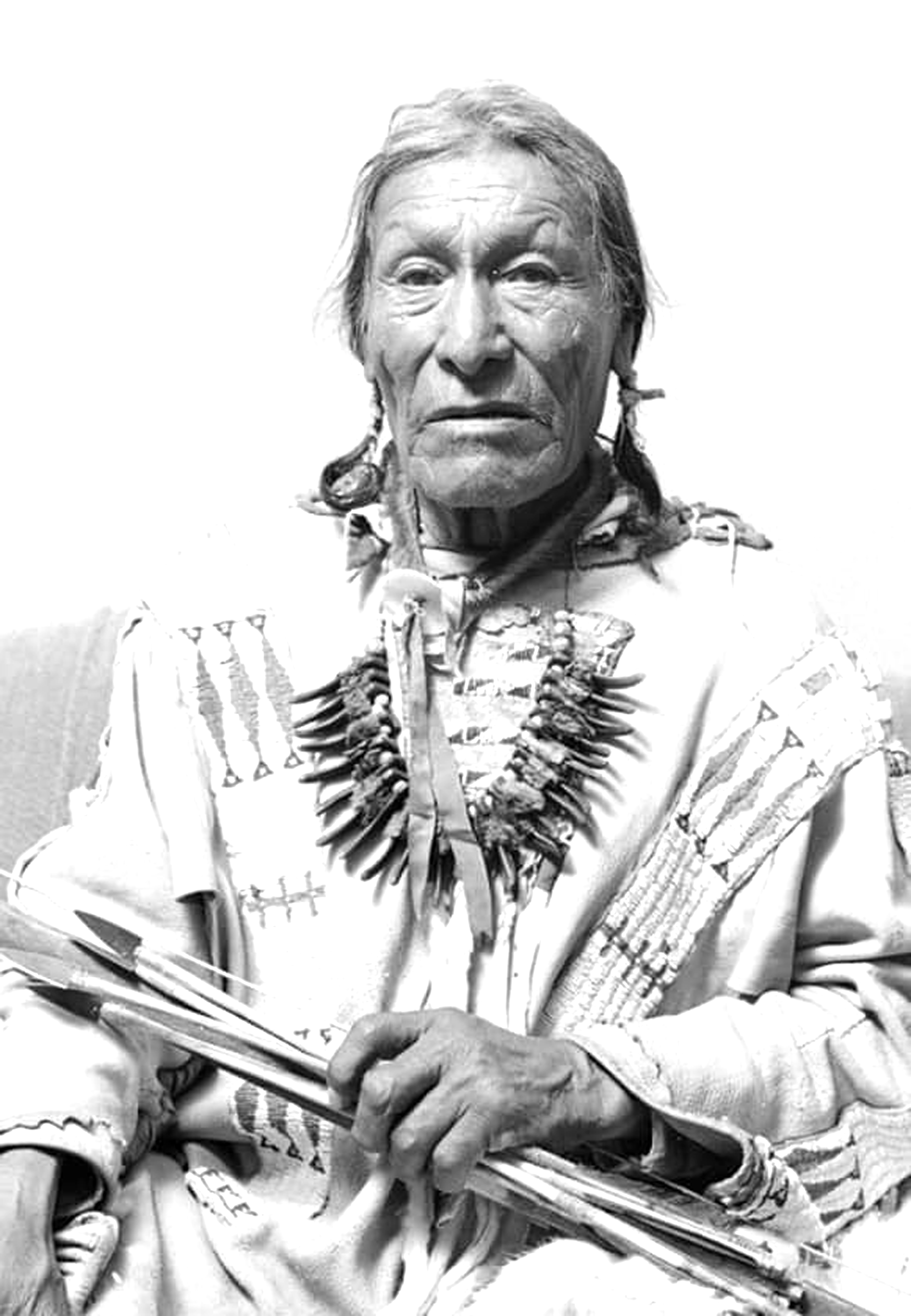
- Dewey Beard, also known as Iron Hail
- Born: c. 1858; Cheyenne River region, South Dakota
- Died: November 2, 1955; South Dakota
- Resting place: Saint Stephen Catholic Cemetery, Kyle, South Dakota
- Known for: Battle of the Little Bighorn; Wounded Knee Massacre
- Spouse(s): Wears Eagle; Alice Lone Bear
- Children: One son

Dewey Beard (Lakota: Wasú Máza, "Iron Hail"; c. 1858 – November 2, 1955) was a Minneconjou Lakota warrior who fought at the Battle of the Little Bighorn in 1876. He later followed Sitting Bull into exile in Canada and returned to South Dakota, where he lived on the Cheyenne River Indian Reservation.

Beard was a survivor of the Wounded Knee Massacre of December 29, 1890, where his wife Wears Eagle was killed. He later married Alice Lone Bear. In his later life, Beard provided an account of the Wounded Knee Massacre, which was subsequently published as "Wounded Knee: A First Person Account."

== Biography ==
Iron Hail joined the Ghost Dance movement and was in Spotted Elk's band along with his parents, siblings, wife and child. He and his family left the Cheyenne River Indian Reservation on December 23, 1890, with Spotted Elk and approximately 300 other Miniconjou and 38 Hunkpapa Lakota on a winter trek to the Pine Ridge Indian Reservation to avoid the perceived trouble which was anticipated in the wake of Sitting Bull's murder at Standing Rock Indian Reservation. He and his family were present at the Wounded Knee Massacre, where he was shot three times, twice in the back and some of his family, including his mother, father, wife and infant child were killed. He recounted his experiences in an in depth interview with Eli S. Ricker for a book Ricker planned to write.

Dewey Beard changed his name from Iron Hail when he converted to Roman Catholicism. He was a member of Buffalo Bill's Wild West show for 15 years and was featured in Buffalo Bill's 1914 silent picture The Indian Wars Refought.

In the early 1940s Beard and his wife Alice were raising horses on their land on the Pine Ridge Indian Reservation. In 1942 the Department of War annexed 341,725 acres (138,291 ha) of the reservation for use as an aerial gunnery and bombing range. Beard's family was among the 125 Lakota families uprooted from their homes. They were compensated by the government for their land in installments which were too low to enable them to afford more property, and as a result they both moved into a poor section of Rapid City, South Dakota.

=== Death ===
When he died in 1955 at age 96, Dewey Beard was the last known Lakota survivor of the Battle of the Little Bighorn, and the last known Lakota survivor of the Wounded Knee Massacre.
