= Porcupine Butte =

Mountain in South Dakota, United States

Coordinates: 43°10′48″N 102°19′25″W

Porcupine Butte is a mountain summit located on the Pine Ridge Indian Reservation in Oglala Lakota County, South Dakota. Porcupine Butte is 3,665 feet (1,117 meters) above sea level. The nearest municipality to Porcupine Butte is Wounded Knee, 2.3 miles away. KILI Radio, 90.1 FM maintains their broadcast facilities at Porcupine Butte, with the transmit tower located on the butte. There is also a fire watchtower located at the top of the butte. BIA Highway 27, also known as Big Foot Trail passes by the butte.

Porcupine Butte was named on account of the prickly pine trees which grow upon the summit.

It was near Porcupine Butte, on December 28, 1890, that Spotted Elks's band of Miniconjou, Lakota and members of the Hunkpapa Lakota band who joined them on their way to join Red Cloud at Pine Ridge, were intercepted by a detachment of the U.S. 7th Cavalry Regiment. They were escorted 5 miles west where they made camp and were surrounded by the rest of the 7th. Cavalry. On the following day December, 29, the Wounded Knee Massacre would take place resulting in numerous deaths including many women and children.
