= M1875 mountain gun =

Mountain gun M1875

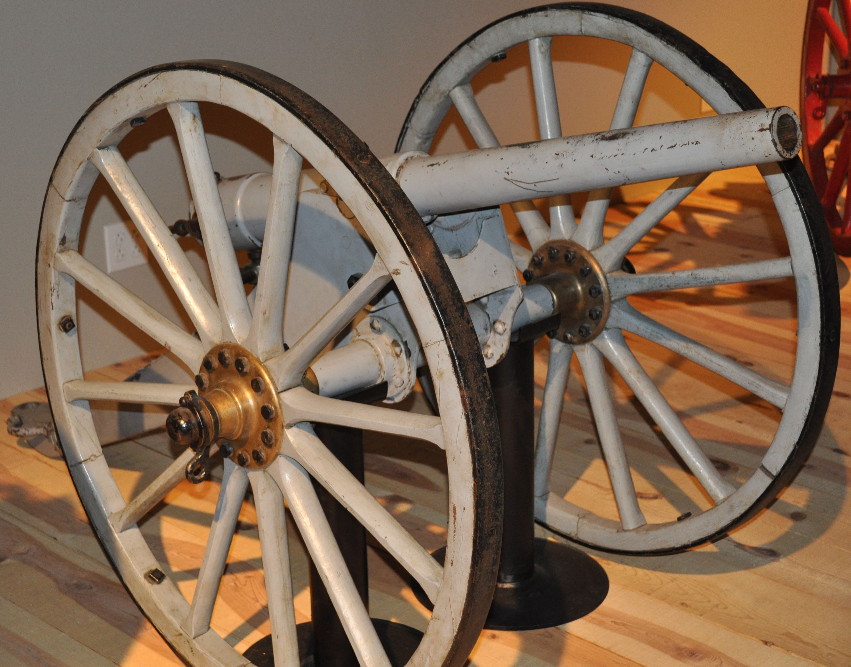
- A Hotchkiss M1875 1.65-inch mountain gun at the U.S. Army Artillery Museum, at Fort Sill, Oklahoma
- Type: Mountain gun

Service history
- In service: 1877–1905?
- Used by: United States
- Wars: American Indian Wars; Spanish–American War; Philippine–American War

Production history
- Designer: Hotchkiss et Cie
- Designed: 1875
- Manufacturer: Hotchkiss
- Produced: 1877–1897
- No. built: 57

Specifications
- Mass: 336 pounds (152 kg)
- Barrel length: 3 ft 10 in (1.17 m) L/25
- Shell: Fixed QF ammunition
- Caliber: 1.65 in (42 mm)
- Breech: Horizontal sliding-block
- Recoil: None
- Carriage: Box trail
- Elevation: +15° max
- Traverse: 0°
- Muzzle velocity: 1,345 ft/s (410 m/s)
- Maximum firing range: 4,000 yd (3,700 m)

The M1875 mountain gun is a mountain gun that was used by the United States Army during the last quarter of the nineteenth century.

A Hotchkiss design from the French arms firm, Hotchkiss & Company founded by Benjamin B. Hotchkiss, (1826–1885), "it was the first original breech-loading gun in the U.S. Army". It replaced the earlier M1841 mountain howitzer used since about 1837, a decade before the Mexican–American War of 1846–1848 in U.S. Army service. It served with cavalry units during the late American Indian Wars, including the 1890 Wounded Knee Massacre, and was also used during the 1898 Spanish–American War in Cuba and the Philippine–American War (Philippines Insurrection) of 1899–1902 in the Philippine Islands. Many were sold as surplus to South and Central American armies, such as Guatemala.

It broke down into two loads for easier mule transport. Another pack mule was required for its ammunition.

An 1878 Ordnance Report from Brigadier-General Steven Vincent Benet narrates part of the history of this gun, stating:

Early in 1876, Colonel Miles, Fifth Infantry, suggested that a light field-gun weighing less than 500 pounds be provided for service on the plains, to replace the obsolete mountain howitzer. The subject was submitted to the Ordnance Board for consideration, with the remark 'that a rifled gun, probably a breech-loader, that can travel with cavalry, and has an effective shell range beyond that of rifled small arms, not less than 1,500 yards, would probably meet the requirements of the service'. While under consideration, Mr. B. B. Hotchkiss presented for examination and trial a light breech-loading rifle that gave promise of efficient service on the frontier, and fulfill the conditions of mobility, range, and accuracy. One was procured, and issued to the Department of Dakota in 1877, and was used in the field that summer. It weighs 116 lbs, and its caliber is 1.65 inches. It uses a charge of 6 ounces of powder, and a percussion shell weighing 2 pounds. While many defects in its mechanism, and in the carriage and ammunition, have been pointed out after the experience of a campaign, showing that modifications are desirable to add to its effectiveness, it did excellent work. I am informed that Colonel Miles expressed himself satisfied that it had rendered efficient service, and was a valuable weapon. With all its defects, others have been called for, and the five now in possession of the department will be issued to the troops.
