= Ghost Shirt =

Amulet shirt used by a Sioux warrior in the Wounded Knee Massacre

The Ghost Shirt is a shirt that is believed to have been worn by a Sioux warrior killed in the 1890 Wounded Knee Massacre. The shirt is plain cotton, has raven, owl, and eagle feathers hanging from the neck, and is pierced in several places with bullet holes. There are slight brown stains of blood, but it cannot be confirmed that the shirt originated from the massacre. Ghost Dance shirts are said to be objects of power to the wearer, and sacred to American Indians. The Lakota Sioux were the only tribe to believe that the ghost shirt clothing would protect them from the bullets of the white man.

In 1891 the shirt was brought to Glasgow with Buffalo Bill Cody's Wild West Traveling Show at Dennistoun. A year later it was given to Kelvingrove Museum by George C. Crager, a member of the show. The shirt was displayed at the museum from 1892 until 1999.

A four-year campaign led by Marcella Le Beau, secretary of The Wounded Knee Association and great-granddaughter of one of the survivors of Wounded Knee, sought the shirt's return to the Lakota people. In November 1998 Glasgow City Council voted to return it after the city residents supported the move. In a gesture of good will, the Ghost Dance Shirt was replaced by another made in 1998 by Marcella Le Beau herself. She said, "This will bring about a sense of closure to a sad and horrible event. Now healing can begin." The Lakota leaders said that the shirt will be displayed at one of the Reservations once a new museum is built. After repatriation ceremonies, the shirt was stored at the Museum of the South Dakota State Historical Society. A celebration was held at Eagle Butte on August 1, 2009, to commemorate the tenth anniversary of the return of this Ghost Dance shirt. In 2018, Marcella Le Beau expressed her desire for the shirt to be moved to the Cultural Center of the Cheyenne River Sioux tribe at Eagle Butte.

== See also ==
- Repatriation (cultural heritage)
