= Drexel Mission Fight =

1890 armed confrontation

- Part of the Ghost Dance War, Sioux Wars
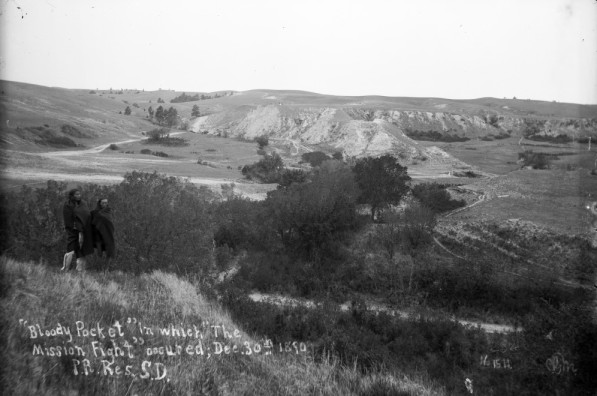
- The 'Bloody Pocket'; location of the Drexel Mission Fight
Date	December 30, 1890
Location	Pine Ridge, South Dakota
Result	U.S. victory

Belligerents
United States	Lakota Sioux; Brulé Sioux

Commanders and leaders
(United States) James W. Forsyth (United States) Guy V. Henry	Chief Two Strike

Strength
7th U.S. Cavalry; 9th U.S. Cavalry	

Casualties and losses
1 dead, 7 wounded	Unknown

The Drexel Mission Fight was an armed confrontation between Lakota warriors and the United States Army that took place on the Pine Ridge Indian Reservation in South Dakota on December 30, 1890, the day after the Wounded Knee Massacre. The fight occurred on White Clay Creek approximately 15 miles (24 km) north of Pine Ridge where Lakota were purported to have burned the Catholic Mission.

Seventh Cavalry under the command of Col. James W. Forsyth with eight troops and a battery of artillery (Battery E, 1st Artillery), the same elements engaged at Wounded Knee the previous day, became engaged by Brulé Lakota from the Rosebud Indian Reservation after reconnoitering to determine if the Catholic mission had been torched. These Indians were purported to be the same Brulé Lakota under Chief Two Strike that had attacked the 9th Cavalry's supply train earlier that morning. The Seventh Cavalry was hotly engaged in a valley by the combined Lakota forces while trying to break contact and withdraw. A battalion of the Ninth Cavalry, a Buffalo Soldier regiment under the command of Maj. Guy V. Henry and nicknamed the Henry's Brunettes, responded to Forsyth's request for assistance, and the combined cavalry forces drove the Lakota from commanding positions on the heights.

In an investigation of the Drexel Mission fight, Maj. Gen. Nelson A. Miles, the commanding general of the Pine Ridge Campaign, severely criticized Forsyth for allowing his command to be pinned down in a valley. He submitted his findings as a supplement to his investigation of Forsyth's conduct at Wounded Knee. Secretary of War Redfield Proctor set aside the Drexel Mission investigation after exonerating Forsyth of any wrongdoing at Wounded Knee.

Three soldiers were awarded the Medal of Honor for actions at White Clay Creek, including Captain Charles A. Varnum, First Sergeant Theodore Ragnar, and Farrier Richard J. Nolan. Almost three decades later Second Lieutenant Sedgwick Rice was awarded a Distinguished Service Medal.

== See also ==
- History of South Dakota
- Plains Indians Wars
