= Wounded Knee Massacre =

1890 massacre of hundreds of Lakota in South Dakota

- Part of the Ghost Dance War and the Sioux Wars
- Mass grave for the Lakota dead after the massacre
Date	December 29, 1890
Location	Wounded Knee Creek, South Dakota 43°08′33″N 102°21′54″W
Result	See Fight and ensuing massacre

Belligerents
United States	Miniconjou Lakota; Hunkpapa Lakota

Commanders and leaders
Arthur Mellette; James Forsyth	Spotted Elk †

Strength
490	120

Casualties and losses
31 killed 33 wounded	90 killed 4 wounded
- 200 Lakota civilians killed 46 Lakota civilians wounded
- Location within South Dakota Wounded Knee Massacre (the United States)

The Wounded Knee Massacre, also known as the Battle of Wounded Knee, was an 1890 armed conflict between Native Americans and the United States Army. It was part of the U.S. Army’s Pine Ridge Campaign. Between 250 and 300 Lakota people were killed, and 51 were wounded (four men and 47 women and children, some of whom died later). Twenty-five U.S. soldiers were killed and 39 were wounded (six of the wounded later died). Nineteen soldiers were awarded the Medal of Honor specifically for Wounded Knee, and 31 overall for the campaign.

The event occurred on December 29, 1890, near Wounded Knee Creek (Lakota: Čhaŋkpé Ópi Wakpála) on the Lakota Pine Ridge Indian Reservation in South Dakota, following a failed attempt to disarm the Lakota people at the camp. The previous day, a detachment of the U.S. 7th Cavalry Regiment commanded by Major Samuel M. Whitside approached Spotted Elk's band of Miniconjou Lakota and 38 Hunkpapa Lakota near Porcupine Butte and escorted them five miles (eight kilometers) westward to Wounded Knee Creek, where they made camp. The remainder of the 7th Cavalry Regiment, led by Colonel James W. Forsyth, arrived and surrounded the encampment. The regiment was supported by a battery of four Hotchkiss mountain guns. The Army was catering to the anxiety of settlers who called the conflict the Messiah War and were worried the ceremonial Ghost Dance signified a potentially dangerous Sioux resurgence.

On the morning of December 29, U.S. Cavalry troops went into the camp to disarm the Lakota. One version of events maintains that during the process of disarming the Lakota, a deaf tribesman named Black Coyote was reluctant to give up his rifle, claiming he had paid a lot for it. Black Coyote's rifle went off at that point, and at the same moment, another Lakota man threw some dust into the air, and approximately five young Lakota men with concealed weapons threw aside their blankets and fired their rifles at the American military. After this initial exchange, the firing became indiscriminate, and the soldiers began firing on the Lakota. The Lakota warriors fought back, but many had already been disarmed.

In 2001, the National Congress of American Indians passed two resolutions condemning the military awards and called on the federal government to rescind them. The Wounded Knee Battlefield, the site of the massacre, was designated a National Historic Landmark by the U.S. Department of the Interior in 1965. In 1990, both houses of the U.S. Congress passed a resolution on the historical centennial formally expressing "deep regret" for the massacre.

== Prelude ==
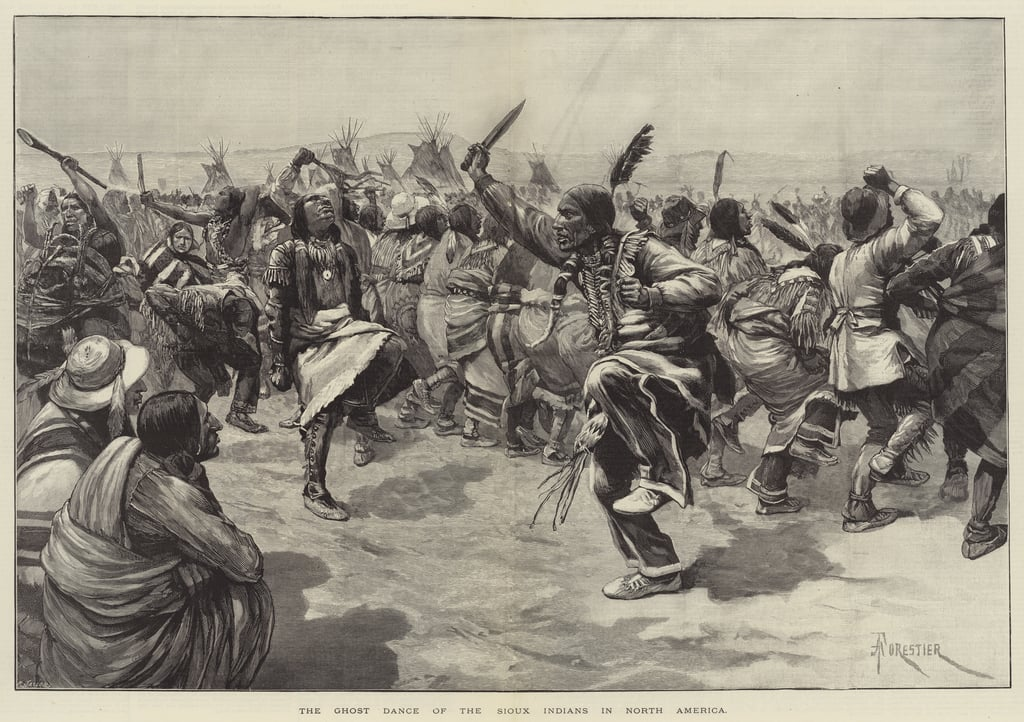
A depiction of the Ghost Dance

In the years leading up to the conflict, the U.S. Government continued to seize Lakota lands. The once-large bison herds of the Great Plains, a staple of the Plains Indians, had been hunted to near-extinction. Treaty promises to protect reservation lands from encroachment by settlers and gold miners were not implemented as agreed. As a result, there was unrest on the reservations. (Note: To this day, the Sioux have refused to accept compensation for the Black Hills land seized from them. A 1980 Supreme Court decision (United States v. Sioux Nation of Indians) ruled the taking was illegal and awarded compensation, increased by interest to $757 million, but not the return of the land which the Sioux sought. The Lakota have refused to take the money, demanding instead the return of the land.) During this time, news spread among the reservations of a Paiute prophet named Wovoka, founder of the Ghost Dance religion. He had a vision that the Christian Messiah, Jesus Christ, had returned to Earth in the form of a Native American. The Ghost Dance, however, was not a Christian faith; it may have adopted the Sun Dance as part of its rituals, and had at its roots the deeper principles of Lakota faith, and the symbols of the old faith. Its purpose was understood to revitalise pre-colonial life and restore it, instead of simply abolishing it. By 1890, nearly one-third of the Lakota had become part of the new religion.

According to Wovoka, the white invaders would disappear from Native lands, the ancestors would lead them to good hunting grounds, the buffalo herds and all the other animals would return in abundance, and the ghosts of their ancestors would return to Earth. They would then live in peace. All this would be brought about by the performance of the slow and solemn Ghost Dance, performed as a shuffle in silence to a single drumbeat. Lakota ambassadors to Wovoka, Kicking Bear and Short Bull, taught the Lakota that while performing the Ghost Dance, they would wear special Ghost Dance shirts, as had been seen by Black Elk in a vision. Kicking Bear misunderstood the meaning of the shirts, and said that the shirts had the power to repel bullets. Some tribes, including the Sioux, believed that a great earthquake and flood would occur which would drown all the whites. The Ghost Dance was understood as a new ritual formed by a new prophet, but was not understood as a clean break with traditional faith, and instead was meant to revitalise it.

The Ghost Dance movement (also called Wanagi wacipi) was a result of the slow but systematic and continuous destruction of the Native Americans' way of life. Tribal land was being seized at alarming rates. The entire livelihood of the plains tribes revolved around the bison, and without the resources the animal offered, their cultures rapidly lost stability and security. This forced them to rely on the United States government to provide rations and goods, or else face starvation. The way of life of these independent people was rapidly fading. The Ghost Dance brought hope: the white man would soon disappear; the buffalo herds would return; people would be reunited with loved ones who had since died; the old way of living before the white man would return. This was not just a religious movement but a response to the gradual cultural destruction. However, the religion was not adopted purely due to the deteriorating humanitarian situation on the reservations. The Ghost Dance faith found a place within the framework of Lakota religion (which is largely non-doctrinal) as all those who met with Wovoka took away their own interpretations of the Ghost Dance, allowing it to be integrated into the development of Lakota faith.

U.S. settlers were alarmed by the sight of the many Great Basin and Plains tribes performing the Ghost Dance, worried that it might be a prelude to armed attack. Among them was the U.S. Indian agent at the Standing Rock Agency where Chief Sitting Bull lived. This agent, D.F. Royer, asked for troops to come to the reservation, while General Nelson Miles stated that 'the most serious Indian war in history was at hand.' Alongside settler hatred of the Lakota, missionaries in the area sought the repression of the Ghost Dance movement, as they considered it a type of heathenism that was necessary to repress in order to 'modernise' the indigenous population. U.S. officials decided to take some of the chiefs into custody in order to quell what they called the "Messiah craze". The military first hoped to have Buffalo Bill—a friend of Sitting Bull—aid in the plan, to reduce the chance of violence. Standing Rock agent James McLaughlin sent the Indian police to arrest Sitting Bull. President Harrison authorised an invasion of the reservation by nearly 1/3rd of the entire U.S. army, and in doing so aimed to win support for the Republicans in the state of South Dakota.

On December 15, 1890, 40 Native American policemen arrived at Sitting Bull's house to arrest him. When Sitting Bull refused to comply, the police used force on him. The Lakota in the village were enraged. Catch-the-Bear, a Lakota, shouldered his rifle and shot Lt. Bullhead, who reacted by firing his revolver into the chest of Sitting Bull. Another police officer, Red Tomahawk, shot Sitting Bull in the head, and he dropped to the ground. He died between 12 and 1 p.m. After Sitting Bull's death, 200 members of his Hunkpapa band, fearful of reprisals, fled Standing Rock to join Chief Spotted Elk (later known as "Big Foot") and his Miniconjou band at the Cheyenne River Indian Reservation.

Spotted Elk and his band, along with 38 Hunkpapa, left the Cheyenne River Reservation on December 23 to journey to the Pine Ridge Indian Reservation to seek shelter with Red Cloud.

Former Pine Ridge Indian agent Valentine T. McGillycuddy was asked his opinion of the "hostilities" surrounding the Ghost Dance movement, by General Leonard Wright Colby, commander of the Nebraska National Guard (portion of letter dated January 15, 1891):

As for the 'Ghost Dance' too much attention has been paid to it. It was only the symptom or surface indication of a deep-rooted, long-existing difficulty; as well treat the eruption of smallpox as the disease and ignore the constitutional disease.

As regards disarming the Sioux, however desirable it may appear, I consider it neither advisable, nor practicable. I fear it will result as the theoretical enforcement of prohibition in Kansas, Iowa and Dakota; you will succeed in disarming and keeping disarmed the friendly Indians because you can, and you will not succeed with the mob element because you cannot.

If I were again to be an Indian agent, and had my choice, I would take charge of 10,000 armed Sioux in preference to a like number of disarmed ones; and furthermore agree to handle that number, or the whole Sioux nation, without a white soldier. Respectfully, etc., V.T. McGillycuddy.

P.S. I neglected to state that up to date there has been neither a Sioux outbreak or war. No citizen in Nebraska or Dakota has been killed, molested or can show the scratch of a pin, and no property has been destroyed off the reservation.

General Miles's telegram

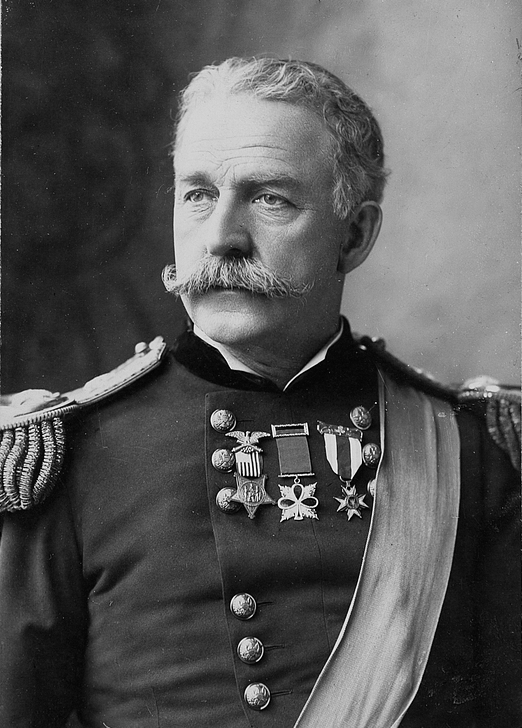
Nelson A. Miles

General Miles sent this telegram from Rapid City to General John Schofield in Washington, D.C., on December 19, 1890:

"The difficult Indian problem cannot be solved permanently at this end of the line. It requires the fulfillment of Congress of the treaty obligations that the Indians were entreated and coerced into signing. They signed away a valuable portion of their reservation, and it is now occupied by white people, for which they have received nothing."

"They understood that ample provision would be made for their support; instead, their supplies have been reduced, and much of the time they have been living on half and two-thirds rations. Their crops, as well as the crops of the white people, for two years have been almost total failures."

"The dissatisfaction is wide spread, especially among the Sioux, while the Cheyennes have been on the verge of starvation, and were forced to commit depredations to sustain life. These facts are beyond question, and the evidence is positive and sustained by thousands of witnesses."

== Fight and ensuing massacre ==
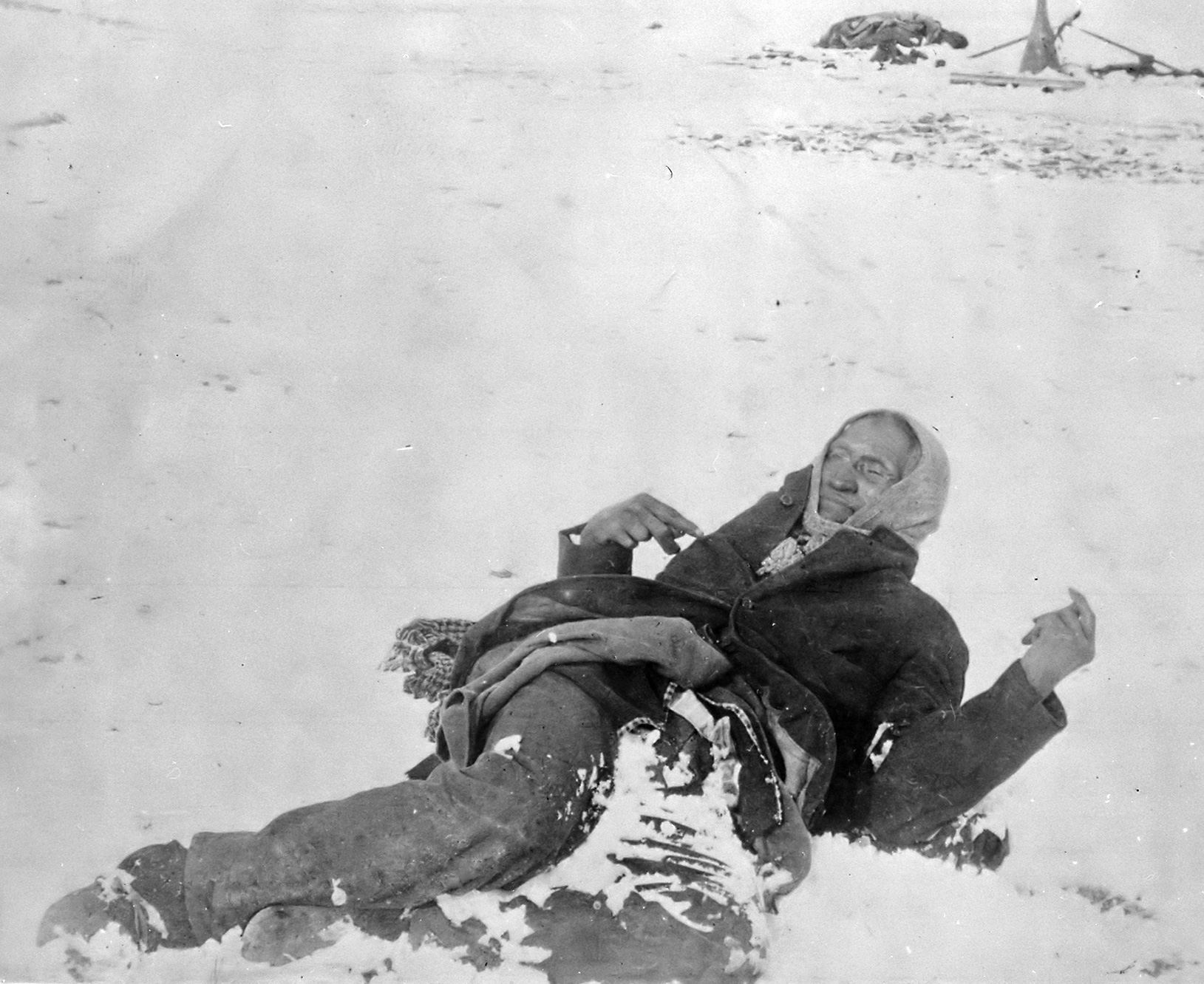
Miniconjou Lakota Sioux Chief Spotted Elk lies dead after the massacre of Wounded Knee, 1890

After being called to the Pine Ridge Agency, Spotted Elk of the Miniconjou Lakota nation and 350 of his followers were making the slow trip to the agency on December 28, 1890, when they were met by a 7th Cavalry detachment under Major Samuel M. Whitside southwest of Porcupine Butte. John Shangreau, a scout and interpreter who was half Lakota, advised the troopers not to disarm the Lakota immediately, as it would lead to violence. The troopers escorted the Native Americans about five miles (eight kilometers) westward to Wounded Knee Creek where they told them to make camp. Later that evening, Colonel James W. Forsyth and the remainder of the 7th Cavalry arrived, bringing the number of troopers at Wounded Knee to 500. In contrast, there were 350 Lakota: 120 men and 230 women and children. The troopers surrounded Spotted Elk's encampment and set up four rapid-fire Hotchkiss-designed M1875 mountain guns. The cannons were breech-loaded, not automatic weapons.

=== December 29, 1890 ===
At daybreak on December 29, 1890, Forsyth ordered the surrender of weapons and the immediate removal of the Lakota from the "zone of military operations" to awaiting trains. Dewey Beard recalled an interpreter's instructions for the disarmament:

This officer asked yesterday for 25 guns, but you did not give them, now he will get them, he will take them himself, so he will pick them himself and you better give those you have in your blankets, and your knives and belts and it will be all right. When you give all the guns and knives, you will stand in one rank right along the edge of this bank (meaning the ravine) and some number of soldiers will stand in front of you and aim the guns at your foreheads, but the guns are unloaded.

A search of the camp confiscated 38 rifles, and more rifles were taken as the soldiers searched the Lakota. None of the old men were found to be armed. A medicine man named Yellow Bird allegedly harangued the young men who were becoming agitated by the search, and the tension spread to the soldiers.

Specific details of what triggered the massacre are debated. According to some accounts, Yellow Bird began to perform the Ghost Dance, telling the Lakota that their "ghost shirts" were "bulletproof". As tensions mounted, Black Coyote refused to give up his rifle; he spoke no English and was deaf and had not understood the order. Another Lakota said: "Black Coyote is deaf," and when the soldier persisted, he said: "Stop. He cannot hear your orders." At that moment, two soldiers seized Black Coyote from behind, and (allegedly) in the struggle, his rifle discharged. At the same moment, Yellow Bird threw some dust into the air, and approximately five young Lakota men with concealed weapons threw aside their blankets and fired their rifles at Troop K of the 7th. After this initial exchange, the firing became indiscriminate.

Eyewitness accounts state that Black Coyote's gun went off when he was seized from behind by soldiers. Survivor Wasumaza, one of Big Foot's warriors who later changed his name to Dewey Beard, recalled Black Coyote was unable to hear. "If they had left him alone he was going to put his gun down where he should. They grabbed him and spinned him in the east direction. He was still unconcerned even then. He [had not had his] gun pointed at anyone. His intention was to put that gun down. They came on and grabbed the gun that he was going to put down. Right after they spun him around there was the report of a gun, was quite loud. I couldn't say that anyone was shot, but following that was a crash". Theodor Ragnar of the 7th Cavalry also stated that Black Coyote was deaf. In contrast, a Native American named Turning Hawk called Black Coyote "a crazy man, a young man of very bad influence, and in fact a nobody."

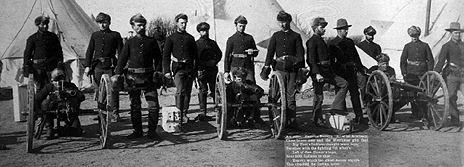
Soldiers pose with three of the four Hotchkiss-designed M1875 mountain guns used at Wounded Knee. (Note: The photographer John C. H. Grabill's caption on the original photograph in the Library of Congress reads: "No.3627. Famous Battery "E" of the 1st Artillery. These brave men and the Hotchkiss guns that Big Foot's Indians thought were toys, Together with the fighting 7th what's left of Gen. Custer's boys, Sent 200 Indians to that Heaven which the ghost dancer enjoys. This checked the Indian noise, and Gen. Miles with staff Returned to Illinois. Photo and copyright by Grabilll ,'91. Deadwood, S.D.")

According to commanding General Nelson A. Miles: a "scuffle occurred between one deaf warrior who had [a] rifle in his hand and two soldiers. The rifle was discharged and a battle occurred, not only the warriors but the sick Chief Spotted Elk, and a large number of women and children who tried to escape by running and scattering over the prairie were hunted down and killed."

Modern historians, including Dee Brown, author of Bury My Heart at Wounded Knee, have supported that Black Coyote was deaf, and that he owned a new Winchester rifle.

At first all firing was at close range; half the Lakota men were killed or wounded before they had a chance to get off any shots. Some of the Lakota grabbed rifles from the piles of confiscated weapons and opened fire on the soldiers. With no cover, and with many of the Lakota unarmed, this lasted a few minutes at most. While the Lakota warriors and soldiers were shooting at close range, other soldiers used the Hotchkiss guns against the tipi camp full of women and children. It is believed that at least some of the soldiers were victims of friendly fire from their own Hotchkiss guns, although the exact number is uncertain. The Lakota women and children fled the camp, seeking shelter in a nearby ravine from the crossfire. According to some accounts, the officers had lost all control of their men. Some of the soldiers fanned out and summarily executed wounded Lakota. Others leaped onto their horses and pursued the Natives (men, women, and children), in some cases for miles across the prairies. In less than an hour, at least 150 Lakota had been killed and 50 wounded. Other estimates indicate nearly 300 (Note: Derived from Nelson Miles' report of some 300 snow-covered forms during his inspection of the field three days later, Miles in a letter states: "The official reports make the number killed 90 warriors and approximately 200 women and children.") of the original 350 having been killed or wounded, with a blizzard preventing immediate search following the massacre. Reports indicate that the soldiers loaded 51 survivors (4 men and 47 women and children) onto wagons and took them to the Pine Ridge Reservation. Army casualties numbered 25 dead. Black Coyote died at Wounded Knee.

I did not know then how much was ended. When I look back now from this high hill of my old age, I can still see the butchered women and children lying heaped and scattered all along the crooked gulch as plain as when I saw them with eyes still young. And I can see that something else died there in the bloody mud, and was buried in the blizzard. A people's dream died there. It was a beautiful dream. And I, to whom so great a vision was given in my youth, — you see me now a pitiful old man who has done nothing, for the nation's hoop is broken and scattered. There is no center any longer, and the sacred tree is dead.

— Eyewitness account from Black Elk (1863–1950), medicine man, Oglala Lakota

== Aftermath ==
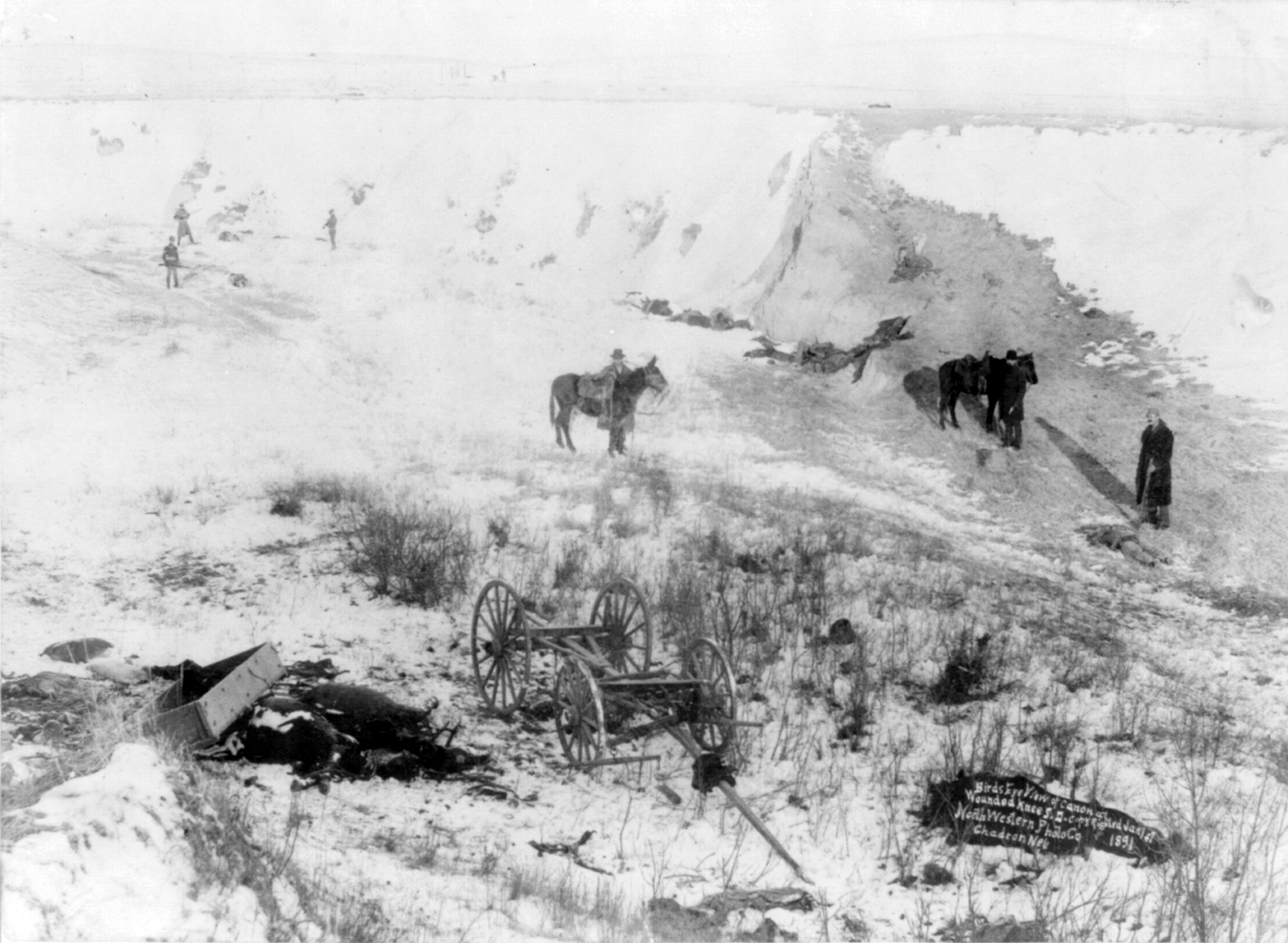
View of canyon at Wounded Knee, dead horses and Lakota bodies are visible

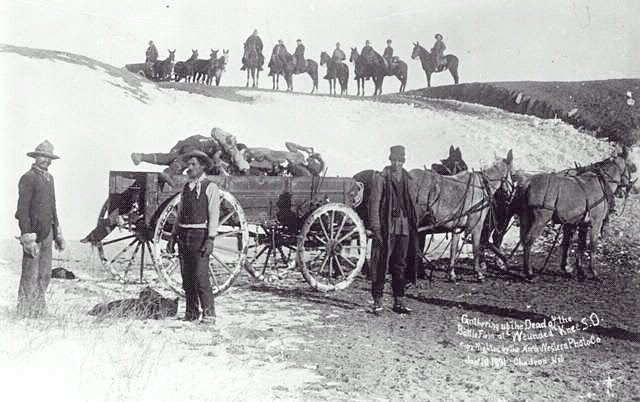
Civilian burial party, loading victims on a cart for burial

Following a three-day blizzard, the military hired civilians to bury the dead Lakota. The burial party found the deceased frozen; they were gathered up and placed in a mass grave on a hill overlooking the encampment from which some of the fire from the Hotchkiss guns originated. It was reported that four infants were found alive, wrapped in their deceased mothers' shawls. In all, 84 men, 44 women, and 18 children reportedly died on the field, while at least seven Lakota were mortally wounded. Miles denounced Forsyth and relieved him of command. An exhaustive Army Court of Inquiry convened by Miles criticized Forsyth for his tactical dispositions but otherwise exonerated him of responsibility. The Court of Inquiry, however, was not conducted as a formal court-martial.

The Secretary of War concurred with the decision and reinstated Forsyth to command of the 7th Cavalry. Testimony had indicated that for the most part, troops attempted to avoid non-combatant casualties. Miles continued to criticize Forsyth, whom he believed had deliberately disobeyed his commands in order to destroy the Lakota. Miles promoted the conclusion that Wounded Knee was a deliberate massacre rather than a tragedy caused by poor decisions, in an effort to destroy the career of Forsyth. This was later whitewashed, and Forsyth was promoted to brigadier, then later, major general.

Many non-Lakota living near the reservations interpreted the battle as the defeat of a murderous cult; others confused Ghost Dancers with Native Americans in general. In an editorial response to the event, the young newspaper editor L. Frank Baum, later the author of The Wonderful Wizard of Oz, wrote in The Aberdeen Saturday Pioneer on January 3, 1891:

The Pioneer has before declared that our only safety depends upon the total extermination of the Indians. Having wronged them for centuries, we had better, in order to protect our civilization, follow it up by one more wrong and wipe these untamed and untamable creatures from the face of the earth. In this lies future safety for our settlers and the soldiers who are under incompetent commands. Otherwise, we may expect future years to be as full of trouble with the redskins as those have been in the past.

Soon after the event, Dewey Beard, his brother Joseph Horn Cloud, and others formed the Wounded Knee Survivors Association, which came to include descendants. They sought compensation from the U.S. government for the many fatalities and injured. Today the association is independent and works to preserve and protect the historic site from exploitation, and to administer any memorial erected there. Papers of the association (1890–1973) and related materials are held by the University of South Dakota and are available for research. It was not until the 1990s that a memorial to the Lakota was included in the National Historic Landmark. In 1968 James Czywczynski purchased 40 acres of property adjacent to Wounded Knee, operating a trading post and museum.

More than 80 years after the massacre, beginning on February 27, 1973, Wounded Knee was the site of the Wounded Knee incident, a 71-day standoff between militants of the American Indian Movement—who had chosen the site for its symbolic value—and federal law enforcement officials. Among the buildings destroyed were the Czywczynski post and Museum; the Czywczynskis moved away asking a purchase price of $3.9 million [land appraised at $14,000]. On September 7, 2022, the Oglala Sioux tribal council and the Cheyenne River Sioux Tribe voted to buy for $500,000 (equivalent to $550,091 in 2025) the 40-acre site from the Czywczynskis. (The Oglala Sioux tribal council already owned one acre of land from Wounded Knee which was donated by the Red Cloud Indian school on the site where the Sacred Heart church had stood.)

=== Stranded 9th Cavalry ===
The battalion of 9th Cavalry was scouting near the White River (Missouri River tributary) about 15 miles (24 kilometers) north of Indian agency at Pine Ridge when the Wounded Knee Massacre occurred and rode south all night to reach the reservation. In the early morning of December 30, 1890, F, I, and K Troops reached the Pine Ridge agency, however, their supply wagon guarded by D Troop located behind them was attacked by 50 Lakota warriors near Cheyenne Creek (about 2 mi or 3 km from the Indian agency). One soldier was immediately killed. The wagon train protected itself by circling the wagons. Corporal William Wilson volunteered to take a message to the agency at Pine Ridge to get help after the Indian scouts refused to go. Wilson took off through the wagon circle with Lakota in pursuit and his troops covering him. Wilson reached the agency and spread the alarm. The 9th Cavalry within the agency came to rescue the stranded troopers and the Lakota dispersed. For his actions, Corporal Wilson received the Medal of Honor.

=== Drexel Mission Fight ===
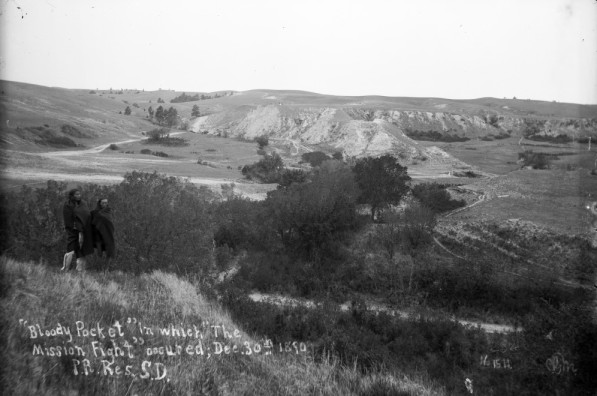
The 'Bloody Pocket', location of the Drexel Mission Fight

Historically, Wounded Knee is generally considered to be the end of the collective multi-century series of conflicts between colonial and U.S. forces and American Indians, known collectively as the Indian Wars. It was not however the last armed conflict between Native Americans and the United States.

The Drexel Mission Fight was an armed confrontation between Lakota warriors and the United States Army that took place on the Pine Ridge Indian Reservation on December 30, 1890, the day following Wounded Knee. The fight occurred on White Clay Creek approximately 15 miles (24 kilometers) north of Pine Ridge, where Lakota fleeing from the continued hostile situation surrounding the massacre at Wounded Knee had set up camp.

Company K of the 7th Cavalry—the unit involved at Wounded Knee—was sent to force the Lakotas to return to the areas they were assigned on their respective reservations. Some of the "hostiles" were Brulé Lakota from the Rosebud Indian Reservation. Company K was pinned down in a valley by the combined Lakota forces and had to be rescued by the 9th Cavalry, an African American regiment nicknamed the "Buffalo Soldiers".

Among the Lakota warriors was a young Brulé from Rosebud named Plenty Horses, who had recently returned from five years at the Carlisle Indian School in Pennsylvania. A week after this fight, Plenty Horses shot and killed army lieutenant Edward W. Casey, commandant of the Cheyenne Scouts (Troop L, 8th Cavalry). The testimony introduced at the trial of Plenty Horses and his subsequent acquittal also helped abrogate the legal culpability of the U.S. Army for the deaths at Wounded Knee.

=== Winter guards ===
The 9th Cavalry were stationed on the Pine Ridge reservation through the rest of the winter of 1890–1891 until March 1891. By then, the 9th Cavalry was the only regiment on the reservation after being the first to arrive in November 1890.

=== Continued armed presence ===
The memory of the massacre, and that Fort Niobrara and Fort Robinson were close to the reservation, disincentivised further armed resistance to colonialism, though more subtle forms of dissent continued. The threat of mass terror remained present in the reservation as indigenous soldiers from Fort Niobrara patrolled the area to pacify the local population. Regular combat troops were not withdrawn from Niobrara until 1906, or 1919 for Fort Robinson.

== Medals of Honor ==
For this 1890 campaign, the U.S. Army awarded 31 Medals of Honor, 19 specifically for service at Wounded Knee. 15 were awarded in the months after the massacre, and four more awarded between 1892 and 1895.

In the Nebraska State Historical Society's summer 1994 quarterly journal, Jerry Green construes that pre-1916 Medals of Honor were awarded more liberally; however, "the number of medals does seem disproportionate when compared to those awarded for other battles." Quantifying, he compares the three awarded for the Battle of Bear Paw Mountain's five-day siege, to the twenty awarded for this short and one-sided action. Historian Will G. Robinson notes that only three Medals of Honor were awarded among the 64,000 South Dakotans who fought for four years of World War II. Historian Dwight Mears points out that awards prior to 1918 were "Medal[s] of Honor in name only," making such comparisons with modern medals inappropriate, since "the medal that existed in 1890 is a materially different award." Mears notes that Army regulations in 1890 stated that "Medals of honor will be awarded, by the President, to officers or enlisted men who have distinguished themselves in action," meaning that they could be awarded for actions that were merely distinguished, not gallant or heroic.

Native American activists have urged the medals be withdrawn, calling them "medals of dishonor". According to Lakota tribesman William Thunder Hawk, "The Medal of Honor is meant to reward soldiers who act heroically. But at Wounded Knee, they didn't show heroism; they showed cruelty." In 2001, the National Congress of American Indians passed two resolutions condemning the Medals of Honor awards and called on the U.S. government to rescind them.

A number of the citations on the medals awarded to the troopers at Wounded Knee state that they went in pursuit of Lakota who were trying to escape or hide. Another citation was for "conspicuous bravery in rounding up and bringing to the skirmish line a stampeded pack mule." Another medal was awarded in part for extending an enlistment. One citation was just "bravery".

In February 2021, the South Dakota Senate unanimously called upon the United States Congress to investigate the 20 medals of honor (actually 19) awarded to members of the 7th Cavalry for their participation in the massacre. Lawmakers argued that the medals given to the soldiers of the 7th Cavalry Regiment tarnished Medals of Honor given to soldiers for genuine acts of courage. Previous efforts to rescind the medals have failed over separation of powers concerns, notably that bills seeking to revoke medals by congressional decree conflict with the public law on the Medal of Honor, which grants all adjudicative authority to the Executive Branch. In March 2021, Senators Elizabeth Warren (D-MA) and Jeff Merkley (D-OR) and Congressman Kaiali'i Kahele (D-HI) answered the South Dakota Senate's call and reintroduced a bill to revoke the Medals of Honor awarded to the soldiers who perpetrated the Wounded Knee massacre. The provision was incorporated into the FY2022 National Defense Authorization Act, but was removed in conference with the explanation that "these Medals of Honor were awarded at the prerogative of the President of the United States, not the Congress." This effectively expressed that since adjudication authority was granted to the executive, that it was not the role of Congress to revoke medals. As a result, the bill failed due to a separation of powers conflict. An identical version of Remove the Stain was added to the National Defense Authorization Act for Fiscal Year 2023 (2022), however, it was again removed from the final version of the defense bill by the Senate Armed Services Committee. The Remove the Stain Act also failed to identify an effective process of revocation, stipulating only that the recipients would be removed from the Medal of Honor Roll. However, none of the Wounded Knee medal recipients were on the Medal of Honor Roll, which was a pension list. Further, even if the recipients had been on the Roll, the Remove the Stain Act protected this type of benefit—a pension, as a subsection of the bill stipulated "this Act shall not be construed to deny any individual any benefit from the Federal Government." As a result of this defect, the bill directed removal of soldiers' names from the Roll (despite none of the impacted soldiers being on the Roll), while simultaneously prohibiting the same removal from the Roll.

In July 2024, Secretary of Defense Lloyd Austin announced a joint Department of Defense and Department of the Interior review to consider revoking the Wounded Knee Medals of Honor. Notably, the DoD review cited the joint explanatory statement for the FY2022 National Defense Authorization Act (which removed the Remove the Stain Act from the bill) as the impetus for the medal review. The DoD review concluded in October 2024, reportedly recommending that no medals be revoked. Cheyenne River Sioux Tribe chairman Ryman LeBeau wrote an op-ed on the outcome, saying "the Pentagon board has recommended that America keep the Medals of Honor for the Wounded Knee Massacre" with all three DoD panelists voting against revocation and both DoI panelists voting in favor. According to LeBeau, "our People have no confidence in such a Pentagon board." Oliver "O.J." Semans, a lead advocate for revoking the medals, also criticized the review process, noting that "military historians weren't used, and it was done over such a short period of time that evidence really couldn't be put together." Semans also noted "the review was flawed in that no historical scholars were included within the panel."

In May 2025, Senators Warren and Merkley, and Representative Tokuda reintroduced the Remove the Stain Act of 2025. Notably, this version of the bill corrected several factual errors, such as the number of barrels of the Hotchkiss guns, the title of the commanding general of the Army, and past tallies of Medals of Honor by conflict. According to O.J. Semans, the bill's goal is "not to rewrite history, but to ensure it is accurate and just - not only for the citizens of the United State but for the world." The new version of the bill has not been referred out of committee.

On September 25, 2025, Secretary of Defense Pete Hegseth announced that following the recommendations of the 2024 report, the awarded Medals of Honor would not be revoked, calling the recipients "brave soldiers" and saying: "We're making it clear, without hesitation, that the soldiers who fought in the Battle of Wounded Knee in 1890 will keep their medals, and we're making it clear that they deserve those medals." Hegseth also claimed "this decision is now final," and "their place in our nation's history is no longer up for debate." A Defense Department official declined to say if the report would be made public. In response, the National Congress of American Indians expressed "[t]his choice disregards the historical record of the brutal, unprovoked, and wrongful massacre of the Lakota by the United States 7th Cavalry and the moral imperative to confront injustice with honesty and courage." Further, the NCAI claimed that Hegseth's decision "champions this atrocious massacre and compounds the harm to the victims’ descendants and to all Native peoples."

In May 2026, the report of the 2024 DoD Wounded Knee review panel was made public by the South Dakota Searchlight. The report identified the chairman of the review, Lieutenant General (Ret.) Thomas R. James, as well as the two Department of Interior panelists, Solicitor Robert T. Anderson and Wizipan Garriott. The report also cited that one DoD panelist was an "active-duty U.S. Army Sergeant Major (MOH Recipient)," of which there were only two at that time: Thomas P. Payne, and Matthew O. Williams. The report included details that the three DoD appointed panelists all voted that there was no evidence of disqualifying conduct, which seemingly contradicted reports by scholars. Specifically, one law review article reported that two Medal of Honor recipients at Wounded Knee continued firing a cannon at Natives after cease-fire had been sounded--one of them "expected a court-martial" for disobedience, and another claimed he could continue firing after cease-fire sounded because "resistance had not ceased." The report also documented that some DoD panelists did not actually read the evidence assembled for the panel, choosing instead to use an artificial intelligence tool to search records. In contrast to the DoD panelists, the two panelists from the Department of the Interior concluded that "none of the 19 soldiers distinguished themselves, and there was inadequate information to determine whether 18 of the 19 had committed individual law-of-war violations."

== Remembrance ==
=== Commemoration of Native American deaths ===
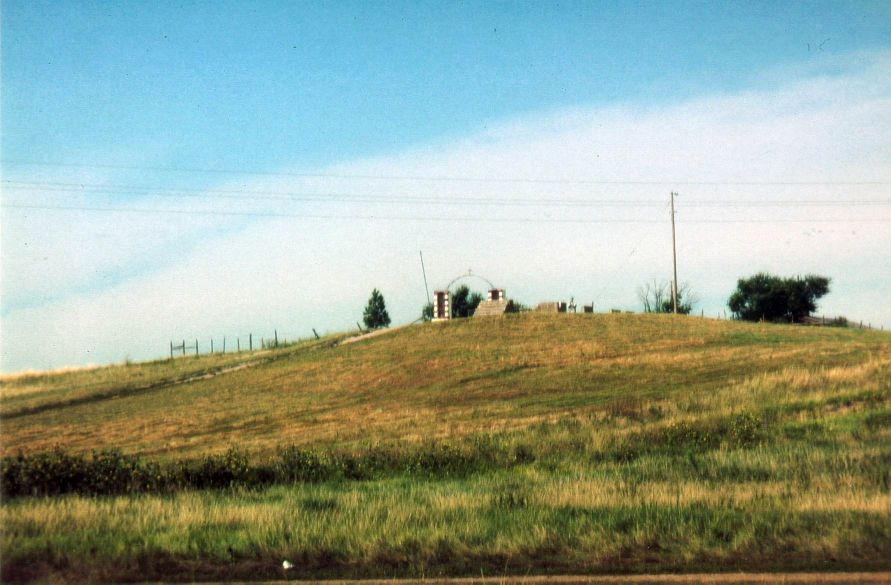
Wounded Knee hill, location of Hotchkiss guns during the massacre and subsequent mass grave of Native American dead

In 1891 The Ghost Shirt, thought to have been worn by one who died in the massacre, was brought to Glasgow, Scotland, by George C Crager, a Lakota Sioux interpreter with Buffalo Bill's Wild West Show. He sold it to the Kelvingrove Museum, which displayed the shirt until it was returned to Wounded Knee Survivors Association in 1998.

In 1903, descendants of those who died in the battle erected a monument at the gravesite. The memorial lists many of those who died at Wounded Knee along with an inscription that reads:

This monument is erected by surviving relatives and other Ogalala and Cheyenne River Sioux Indians in memory of the Chief Big Foot massacre December 29, 1890. Col. Forsyth in command of U.S. troops. Big Foot was a great chief of the Sioux Indians. He often said, 'I will stand in peace till my last day comes.' He did many good and brave deeds for the white man and the red man. Many innocent women and children who knew no wrong died here.

Wounded Knee was declared a U.S. National Historic Landmark in 1965 and was listed on the U.S. National Register of Historic Places in 1966.

Beginning in 1986, the group named "Big Foot Memorial Riders" was formed where they will go to continue to honor the dead. The ceremony has attracted more participants each year and riders and their horses live with the cold weather, as well as the lack of food and water, as they retrace the path that their family members took to Wounded Knee. They carry with them a white flag to symbolize their hope for world peace, and to honor and remember the victims so that they will not be forgotten.

=== Seventh Cavalry Regiment ===
When the 7th Cavalry Regiment returned to duty at Fort Riley from Pine Ridge, South Dakota, the soldiers of the regiment raised money for a monument for members of the regiment killed at Wounded Knee. About $1,950 (equivalent to $69,875 in 2025) was collected, and on July 25, 1893, the monument was dedicated with 5,500 people in attendance. The stone edifice stands near Waters Hall.

=== Wounded Knee as worst mass shooting in U.S. history ===
Many popular media sources write about the event as "the worst mass shooting" in United States history, though the term "mass shooting" lacks any clear definition. Often the distinction as "worst mass shooting" is compared to other mass shootings in the United States after a mass casualty event involving a single shooter and numerous dead, whereas the Wounded Knee Massacre involved numerous shooters from the United States government of unarmed Lakota men, women, and children. Often after a mass shooting in the United States after it becomes known how many people have died due to the firearm related fatality, a comparison to other mass shootings might be reported on in the media, at this point, some critics point out that the Wounded Knee massacre is sometimes forgotten in place of more recent mass shootings, either as a result of:

1. Wounded Knee having occurred more in the distant past,
2. The United States government having perpetrated the Wounded Knee shooting instead of a lone wolf or private civilian shooters, or;
3. Media attention tending to "... gloss over Native American massacres ..."

== Order of battle ==
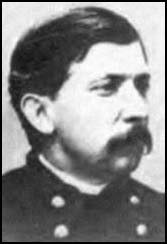
Colonel James W. Forsyth

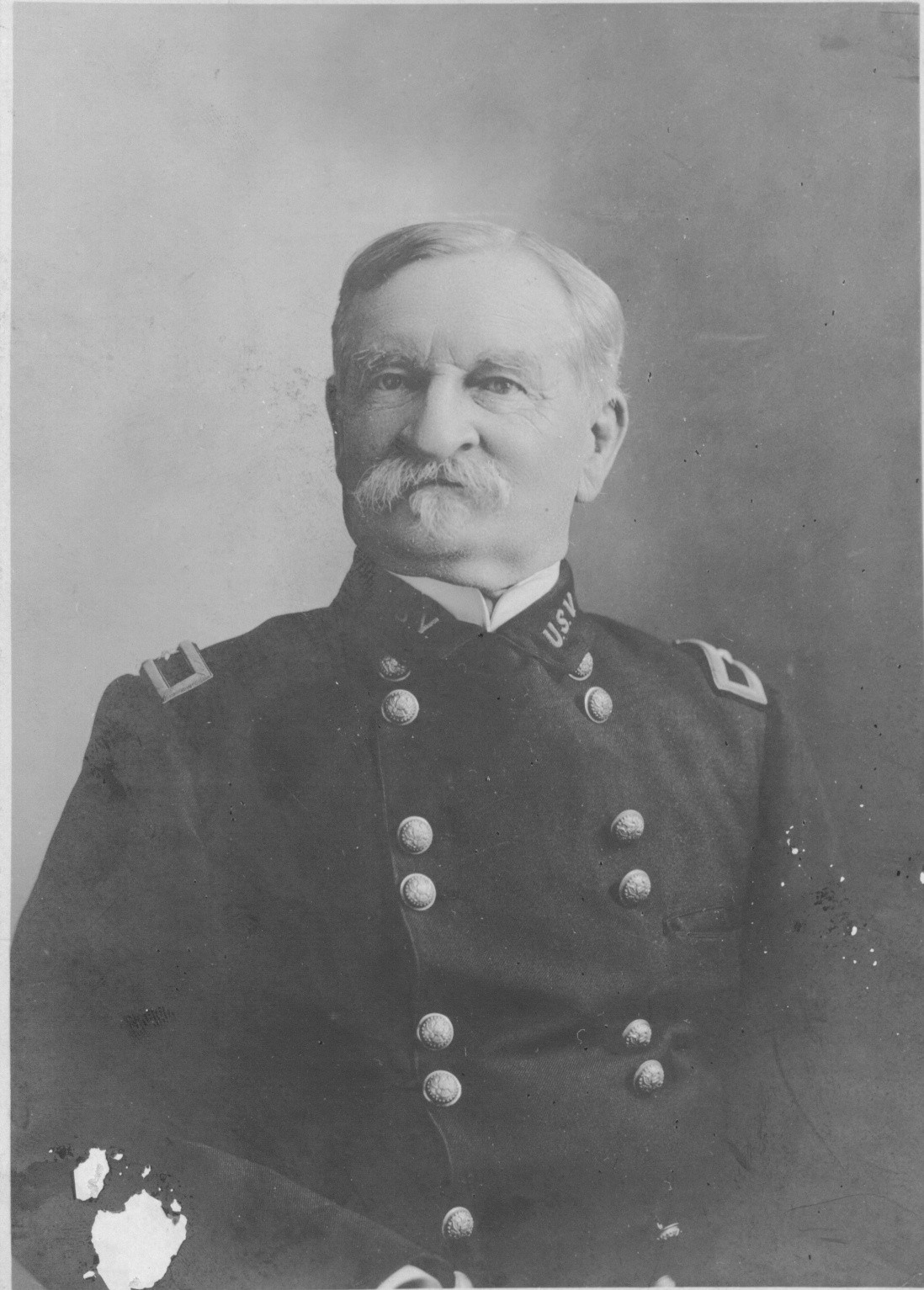
Major Samuel Whitside

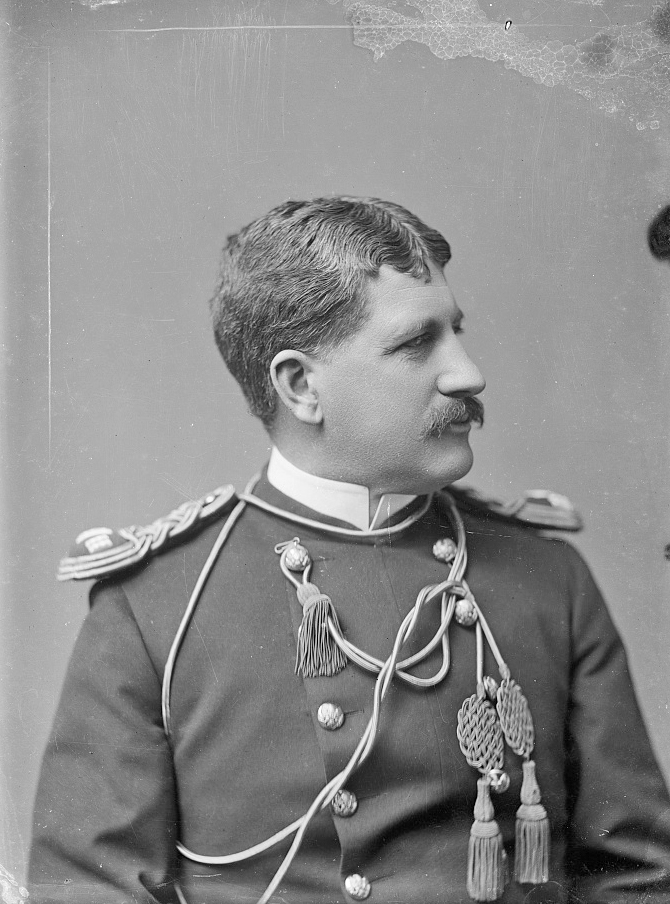
Captain Winfield Scott Edgerly

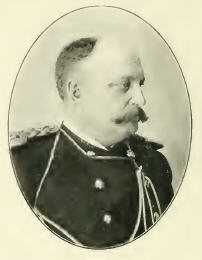
Captain Allyn Capron, Sr.

7th U.S. Cavalry
Col James W. Forsyth

- Adjutant: 1st Lt. Lloyd S. McCormick
- Quartermaster: 1st Lt. Ezra B. Fuller
- Assistant Surgeon & Medical Director: Cpt. John Van Rennselaer Hoff
- Assistant Surgeon: 1st Lt. James Denver Glennan

First Squadron
Maj Samuel Whitside

Adjutant: 1st Lt. William Jones Nicholson

Troop A: Cpt. Myles Moylan, 1st Lt. Ernest A. Garlington
Troop B: Cpt. Charles A. Varnum, 1st Lt. John C. Gresham
Troop I: Cpt. Henry J. Nowlan, 2nd Lt. John C. Waterman
Troop K: Cpt. George D. Wallace (k), 1st Lt. James D. Mann

Second Squadron
Cpt. Charles S. Isley

Adjutant: 1st Lt. W.W. Robinson II

Troop C: Cpt. Henry Jackson, 2nd Lt. T.Q. Donaldson
Troop D: Cpt. Edward S. Godfrey, 2nd Lt. S.R.J. Tompkins
Troop E: Cpt. Charles S. Isley, 1st Lt. Horatio G. Sickel, 2nd Lt. Sedgwick Rice
Troop G: Cpt. Winfield S. Edgerly, 1st Lt. Edwin P. Brewer

Battery E, 1st U.S. Artillery
Captain Allyn Capron

2nd Lt. Harry L. Hawthorne (2nd U.S. Artillery)

4 Hotchkiss Breech-Loading Mountain Rifles

Troop A, Indian Scouts

1st Lt. Charles W. Taylor (9th U.S. Cavalry)
2nd Lt. Guy H. Preston (9th U.S. Cavalry)

Lakota
120 men, 230 women and children

== Gallery ==
Ghost Dance and massacre aftermath
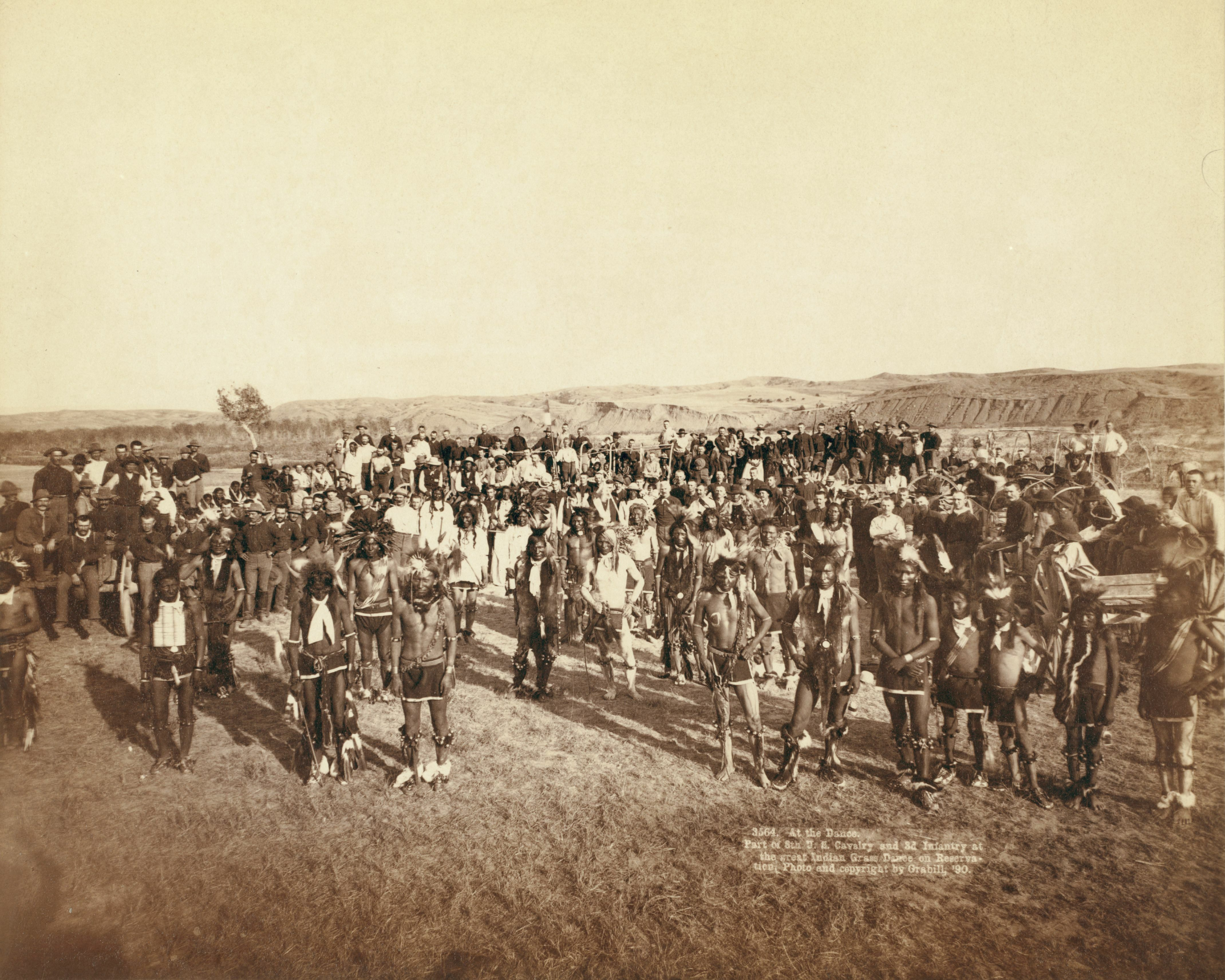
Miniconjou Lakota dance at Cheyenne River, South Dakota, August 9, 1890

Holy Cross Episcopal Mission, used as hospital for wounded Lakota

Photographer taking pictures of campsite

Frozen corpse on field

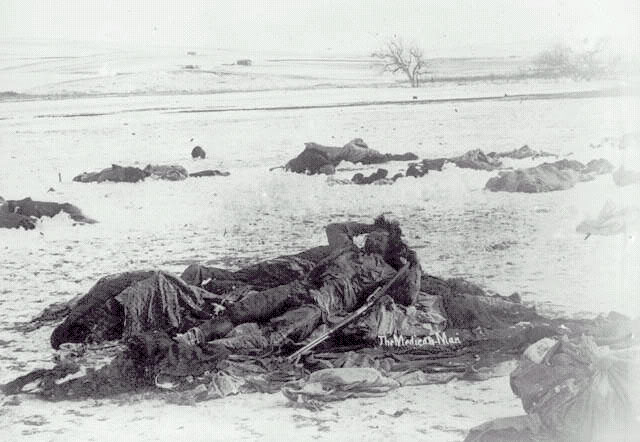
Photograph sold as being that of the Medicine Man "Yellow Bird"; the presence of the rifle however suggests that it is actually the body of "Black Coyote"

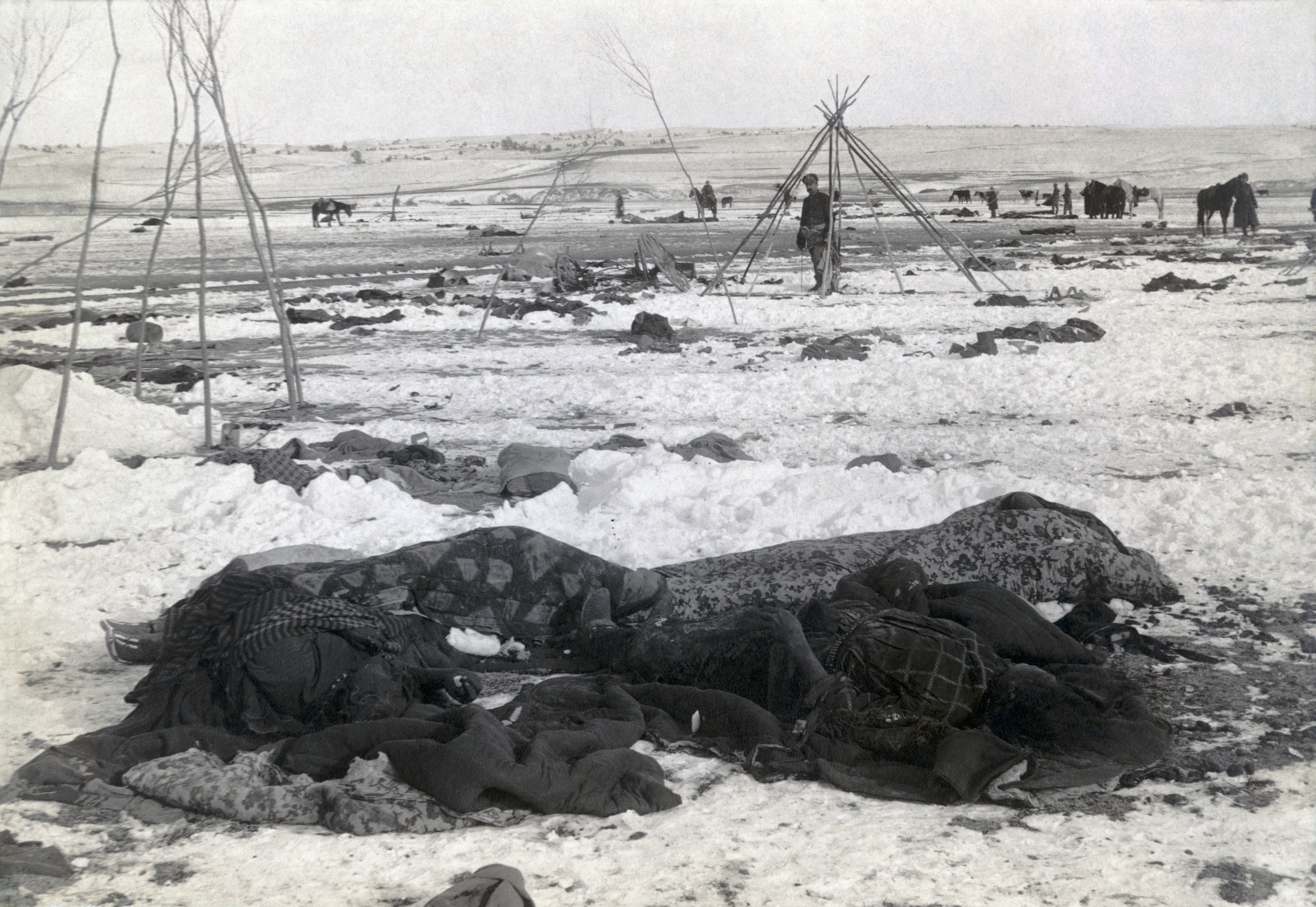
The scene three weeks afterwards, with several bodies partially wrapped in blankets in the foreground.

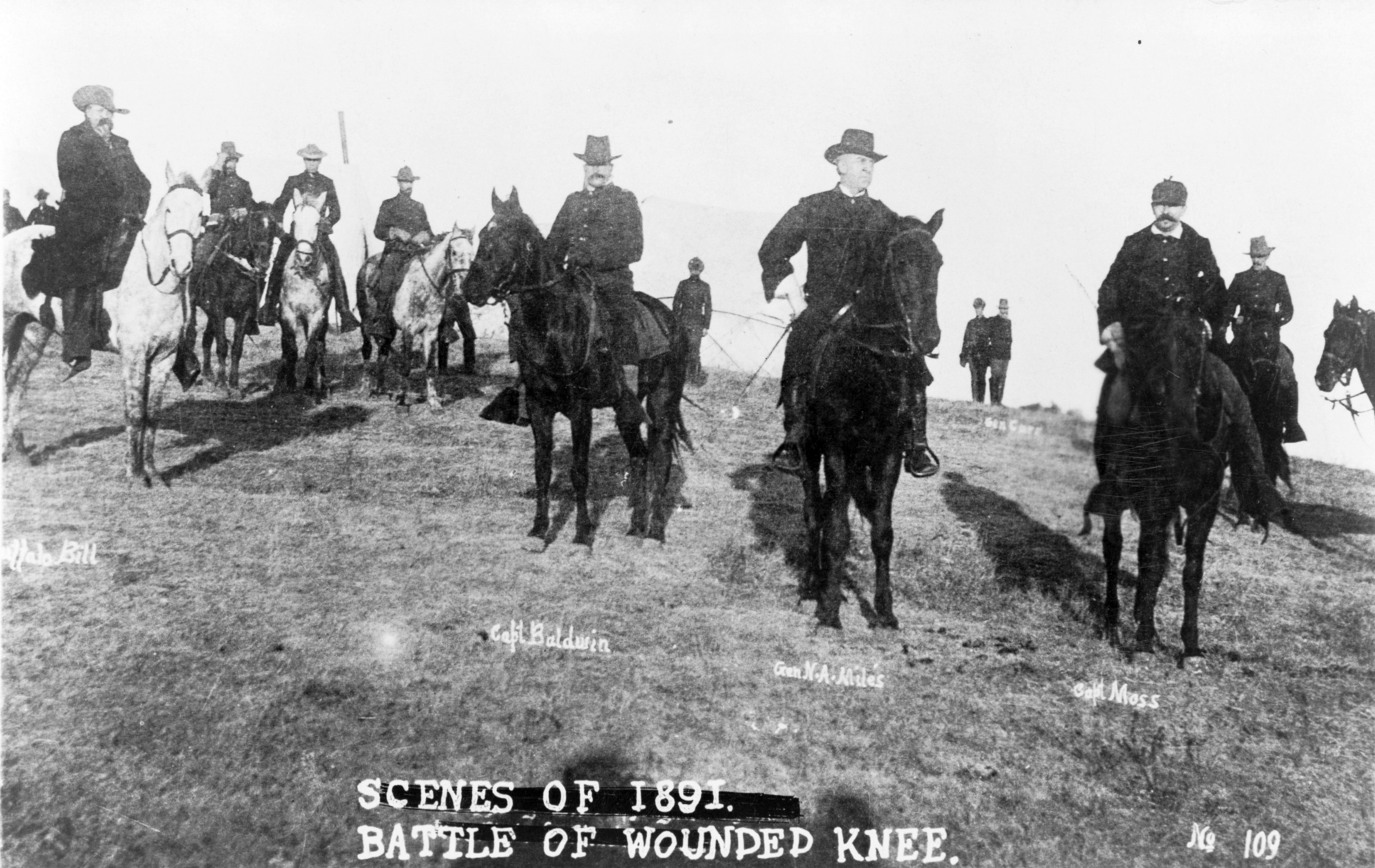
Buffalo Bill, Capt. Baldwin, Gen. Nelson A. Miles, Capt. Moss, and others, on horseback, on battlefield of Wounded Knee.

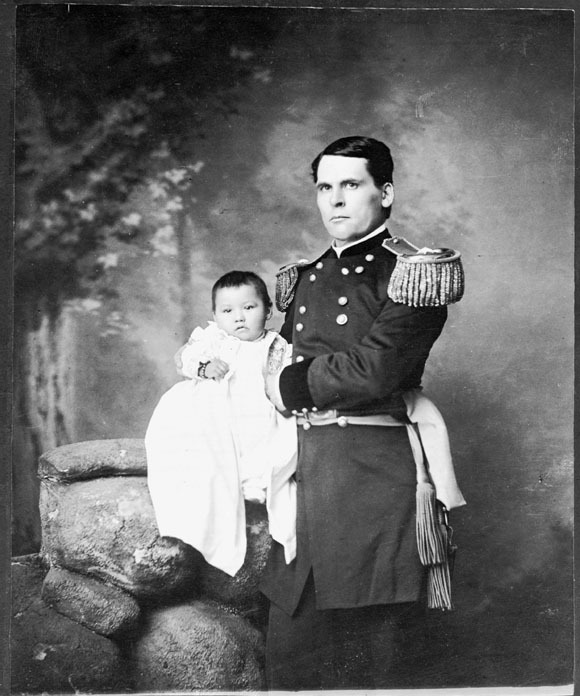
Gen. L. W. Colby holding Zintkála Nuni (Little Lost Bird), found alive on the snow-covered Wounded Knee field four days after the massacre, still tied to her dead mother's back
Maps of Wounded Knee and environs
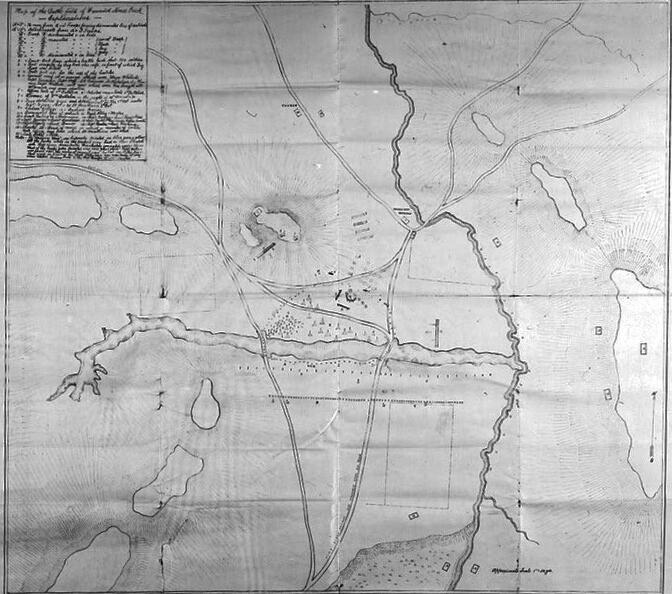
Map of Wounded Knee battlefield scene produced by James W. Forsyth (1834– 1906)

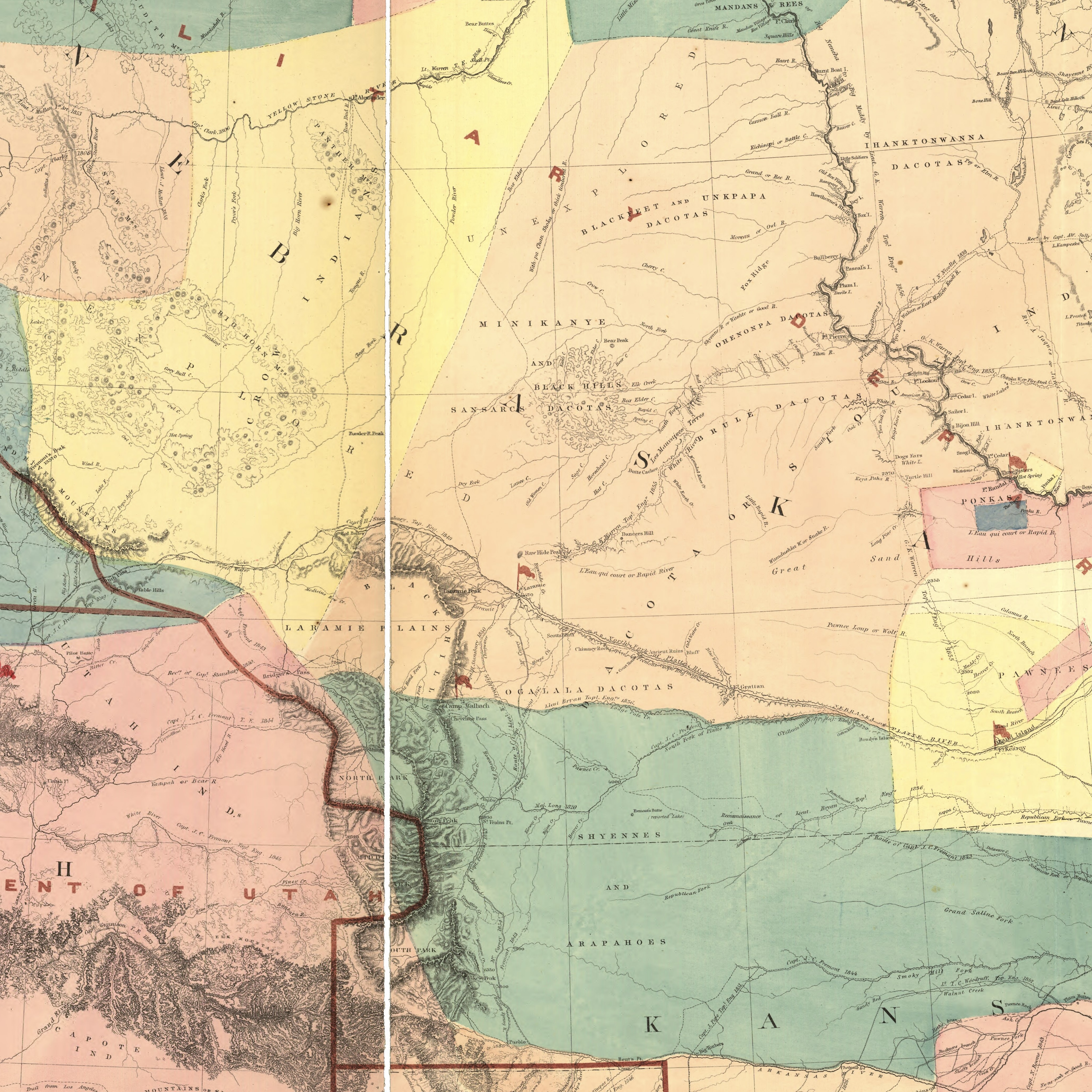
1858 War Department map of the Great Plains; Fort Laramie is marked with a red flag, Wounded Knee Creek is visible between the S and the K in Nebraska

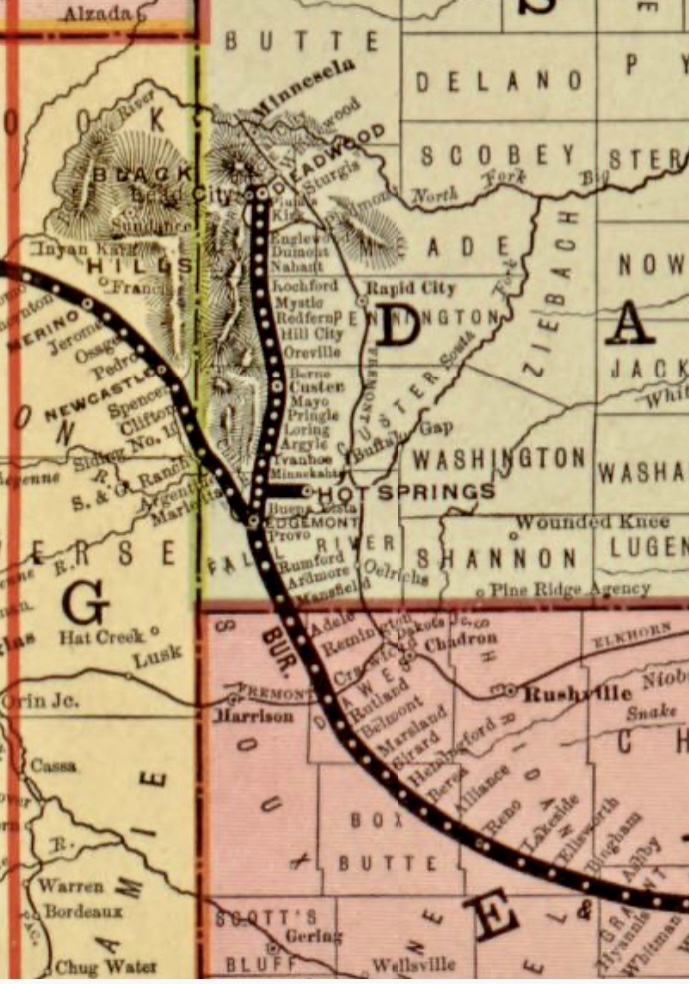
Excerpt of Burlington Route map produced 1892, showing site of Wounded Knee and Deadwood Central Railroad into the Black Hills

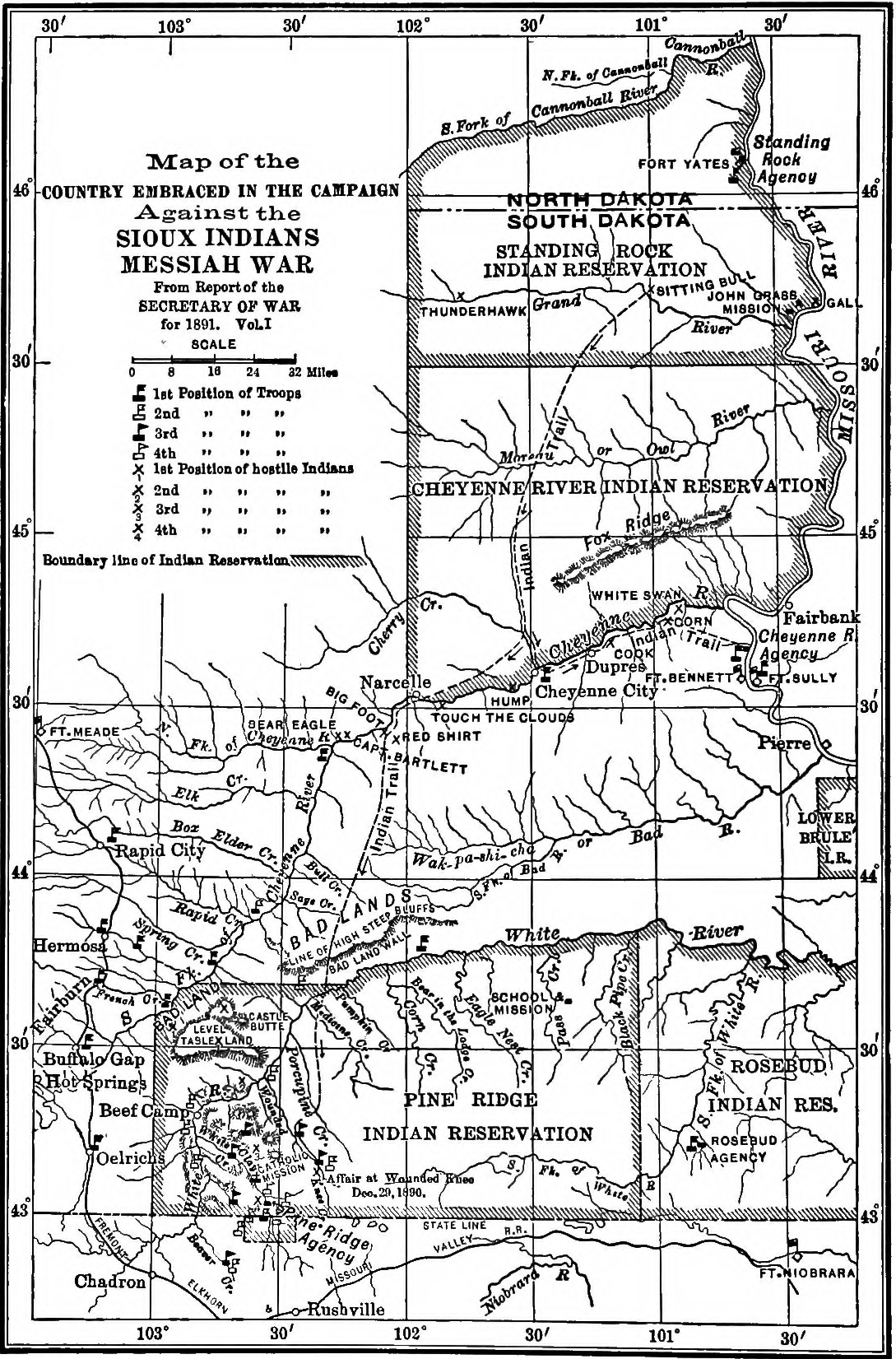
"Map of the country embraced in the campaign against the Sioux Indians Messiah War" (1905)

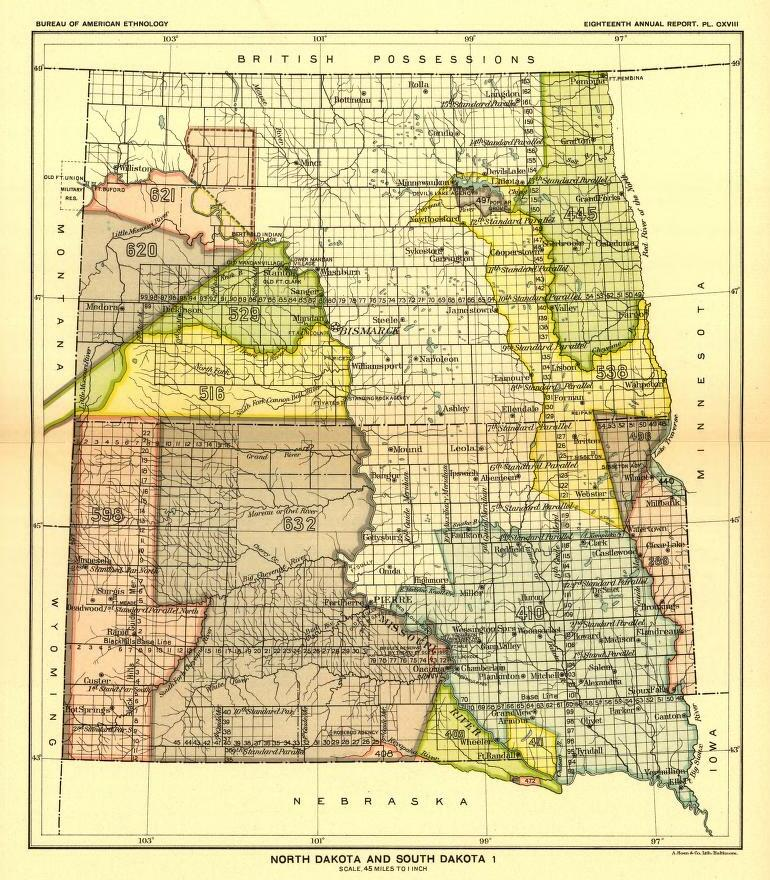
North Dakota and South Dakota map 1 (of 3) from Indian Land Cessions in the United States (1898)

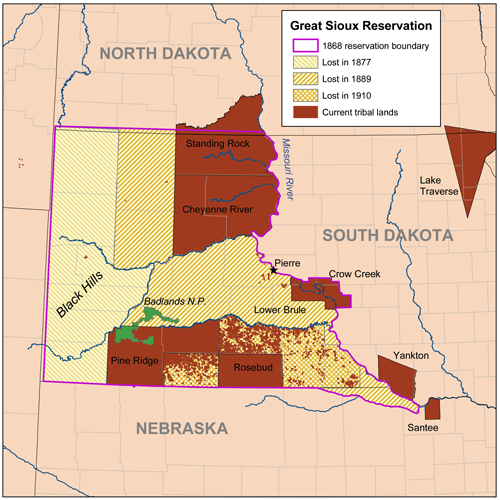
Map of the Great Sioux Reservation
Later photographs of Wounded Knee
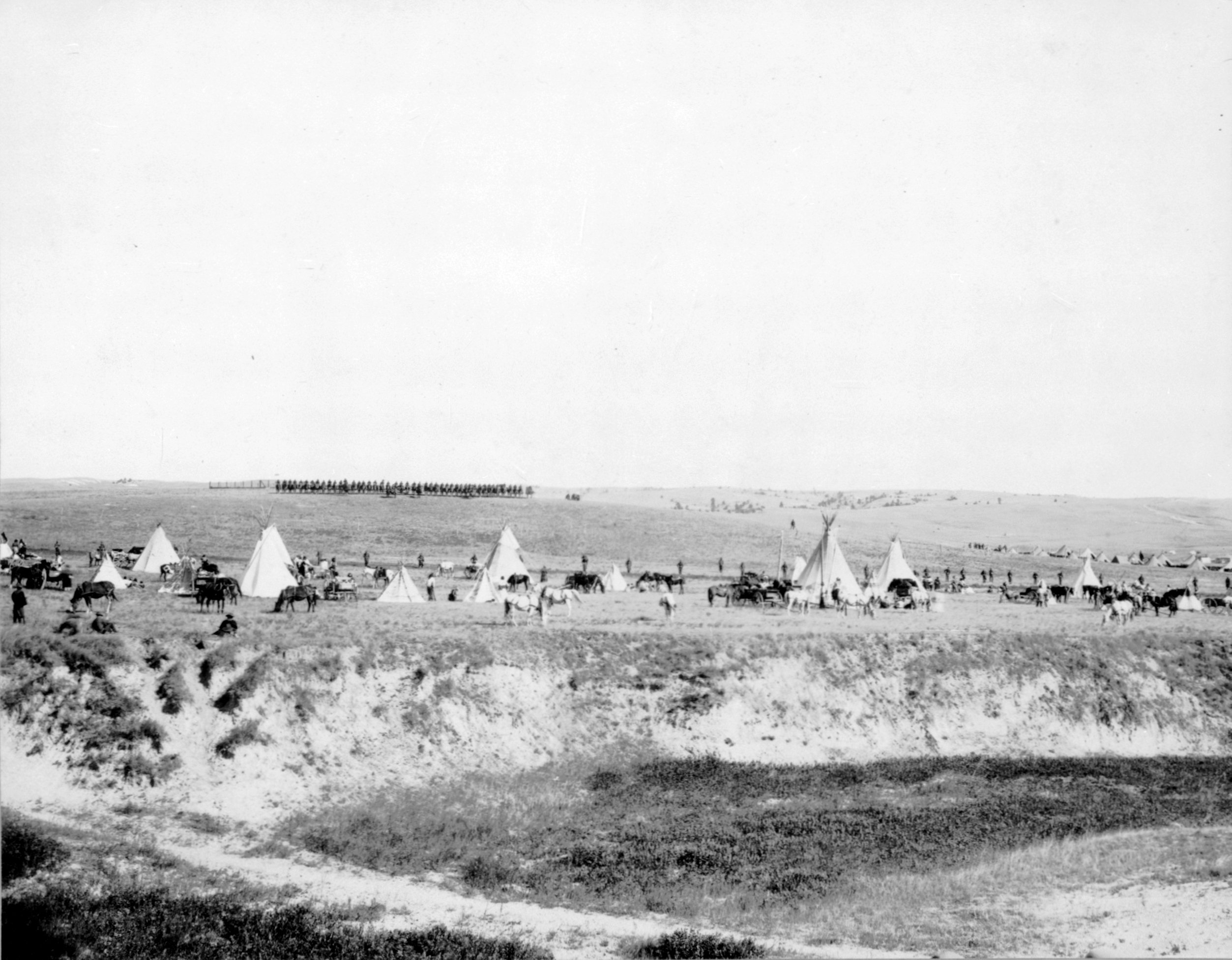
Reenactment of U.S. troops surrounding the Lakota at Wounded Knee (1913).

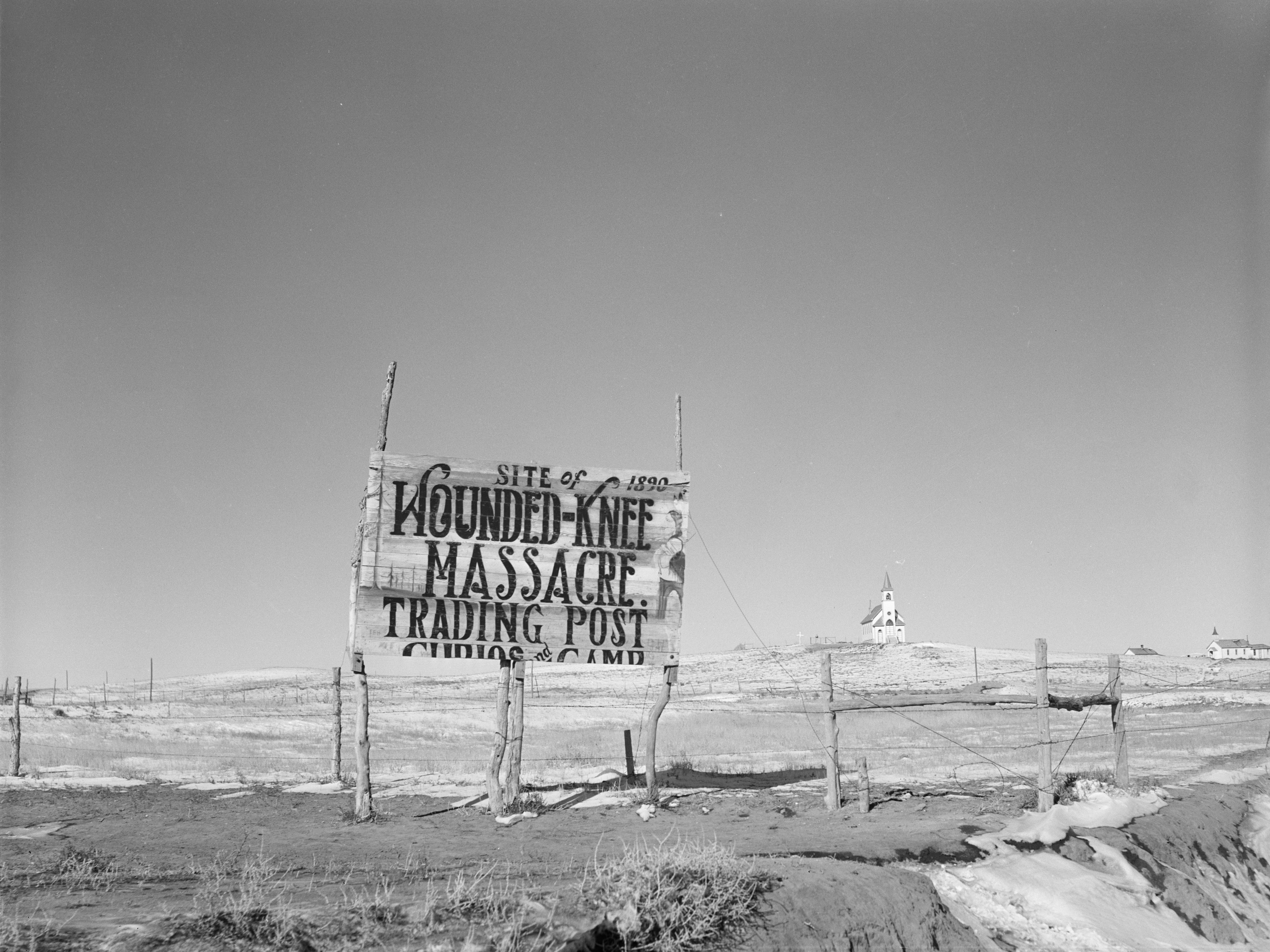
Wounded Knee, 1940

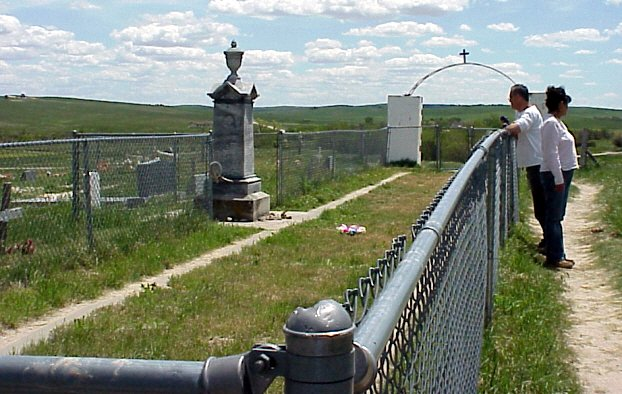
Wounded Knee grave, 2003

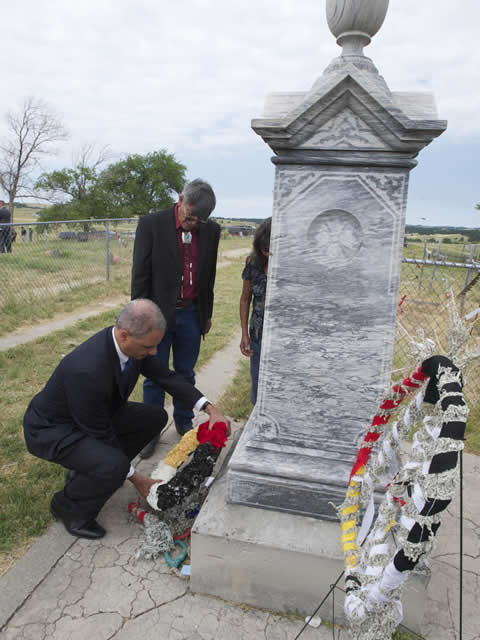
US Attorney General Eric Holder laying a wreath at the site of the Wounded Knee Memorial

== In popular culture ==
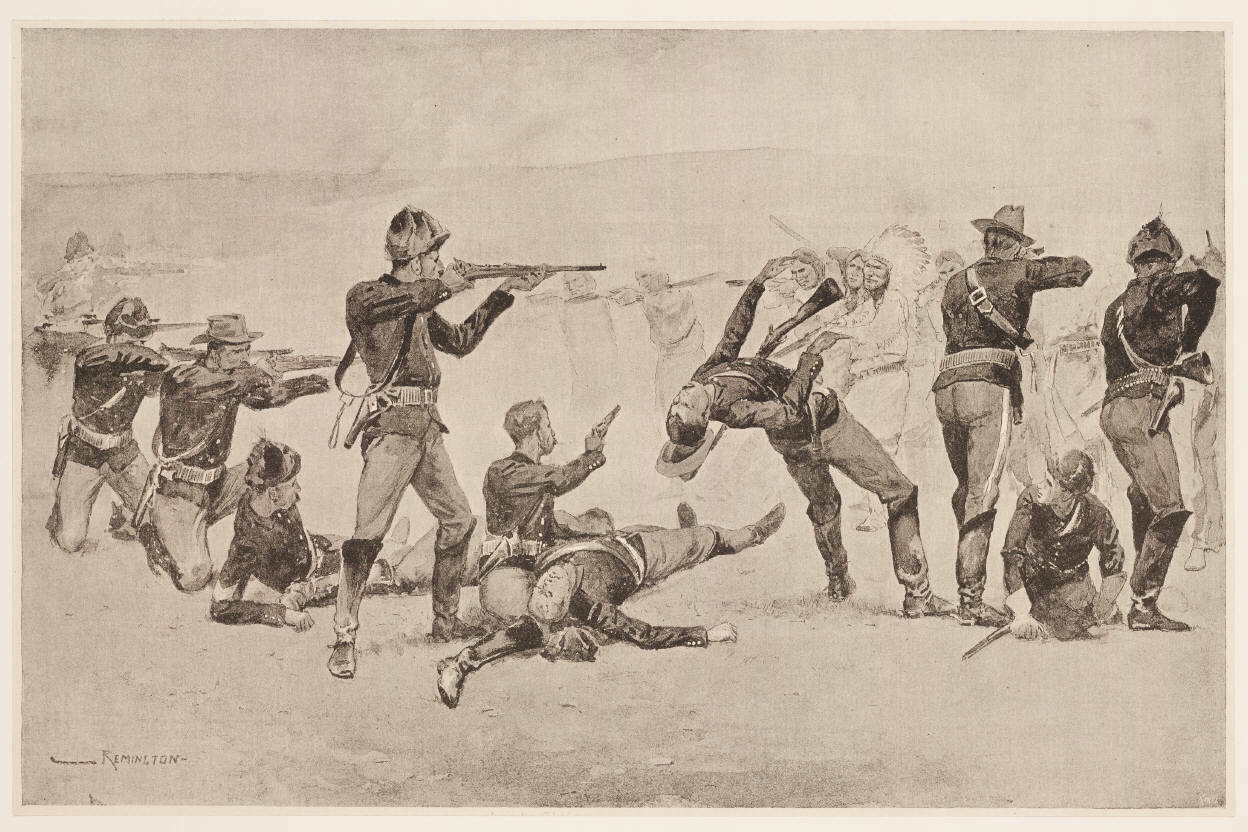
"The opening of the fight at Wounded Knee", engraved illustration by Frederic Remington. Appeared as an illustration in Harper's Weekly, 1891

=== Bury my heart at Wounded Knee ===
In his 1931 poem "American Names", Stephen Vincent Benét coined the phrase "Bury my heart at Wounded Knee". The poem is about his love of American place names, not making reference to the "battle". When the line was used as the title of historian Dee Brown's 1970 best-selling book, awareness was raised and Benet's phrase became popularly associated with the incident.

Since the publication of the book, the phrase "Bury my heart at Wounded Knee" has been used many times in reference to the battle, especially in music.

In 1972, Robbie Basho released the song "Wounded Knee Soliloquy" on the album The Voice of the Eagle.

In 1973, Stuttgart, Germany's Gila released a krautrock/psychedelic folk album by the same name.

In 1992, Beverly (Buffy) Sainte-Marie released her song titled "Bury My Heart at Wounded Knee" on Coincidence and Likely Stories.

=== In other music ===
Artists who have written or recorded songs referring to the battle at Wounded Knee include: Walela "Wounded Knee" from the 1997 self-titled album. Nightwish ("Creek Mary's Blood" from their 2004 album "Once" featuring John Two-Hawks); Manowar ("Spirit Horse Of The Cherokee" from the 1992 album The Triumph Of Steel ); Grant Lee Buffalo ("Were You There?" from the album Storm Hymnal 2001); Johnny Cash (1972's "Big Foot", which is strongly sympathetic); Gordon Lightfoot ("Protocol" from his 1976 album Summertime Dream); Indigo Girls (a 1995 cover of Sainte-Marie's song); Charlie Parr ("1890" on his 2010 album When the Devil Goes Blind); Nik Kershaw ("Wounded Knee" on his 1989 album The Works); 1982 Single by Southern Death Cult ("Moya"); The Waterboys ("Bury My Heart"); Uriah Heep; Primus; Nahko and Medicine for the People; Patti Smith; Robbie Robertson; Five Iron Frenzy wrote the 2001 song "The Day We Killed" with mentions of Black Kettle, and quotes Black Elk's account from Black Elk Speaks on the album Five Iron Frenzy 2: Electric Boogaloo; Toad the Wet Sprocket; Marty Stuart; Bright Eyes; and "Pocahontas" by Neil Young. On Sam Roberts' 2006 Chemical City album, the song "The Bootleg Saint" contains a line critical of Wounded Knee. There is also a Welsh song titled "Gwaed Ar Yr Eira Gwyn" by Tecwyn Ifan on this incident. The song "American Ghost Dance" by the Red Hot Chili Peppers makes extensive reference to the massacre as well.

In 1973, the American rock band Redbone, formed by Native Americans Patrick and Lolly Vasquez, released the song "We Were All Wounded at Wounded Knee". The song ends with the subtly altered sentence "We were all wounded by Wounded Knee." The song reached the number-one chart position across Europe. In the U.S., the song was initially withheld from release and then banned by several radio stations. Richard Stepp's 2008 Native American Music Awards Native Heart nominated album The Sacred Journey, has "Wounded Knee" as its final track.

=== In film ===
The massacre has been referred to in films, including Thunderheart (1992), Legends of the Fall (1994), Hidalgo (2004), and Hostiles (2017). The 2005 TNT mini-series Into the West included scenes of the massacre. In 2007, HBO Films released a film adaptation of the Dee Brown bestseller Bury My Heart at Wounded Knee. The 2016 film Neither Wolf Nor Dog has its climax at the massacre site and was filmed on location there.

=== Other ===
In the 1992 video game Teenage Mutant Ninja Turtles: Turtles in Time, one level is called "Bury My Shell at Wounded Knee." It takes place in 1885 AD on a train in the Old American West.

In the 1996 DC comic book Saint of Killers, written by Garth Ennis, the main character becomes a surrogate Angel of Death, reaping souls whenever men kill other men violently. The story is set in the 1880s, and near the end of chapter 4, it is said that "four years later" he was called upon at Wounded Knee.

In the 2013 video game BioShock Infinite, several main characters are veterans of Wounded Knee. The protagonist, Booker DeWitt, is haunted by his deeds during the battle and at one point confronts one of his (fictional) superiors from the event.

The Wounded Knee Massacre, and the events leading to it, constitute the final chapter of Złoto Gór Czarnych (Gold of the Black Hills), a trilogy of novels told from the perspective of the Santee Dakota tribe by Polish author Alfred Szklarski and his wife Krystyna Szklarska.

== See also ==
- Genocide of indigenous peoples – Elimination of indigenous inhabitants
- Indian massacres in the United States
- Native American genocide in the United States – Ethnic cleansing in the United States
- Plains Indians Wars
- Thomas Quinton Donaldson Jr. – United States Army Major General
- Trail of Tears
- Wounded Knee incident – 1973 American Indian occupation protest
- Wounded Knee of Alaska – 1784 massacre in Alaska
