= Thurman =

Thurman is an English surname and a masculine given name. It may refer to:

== Surname ==
- Allen G. Thurman (1813–1895), American politician and vice-presidential candidate
- Allen W. Thurman (died 1922), American politician and baseball executive, son of Allen G.
- Amber Thurman (1993–2022), American medical assistant who died during a medication abortion
- Andrew Thurman (born 1991), American baseball player
- Annie Thurman (born 1996), American actress
- Arthur Thurman (1879–1919), American racecar driver
- Arthur Thurman (footballer) (1874–1900), English footballer
- Bill Thurman (1920–1995), American film and television actor
- Bob Thurman (1917–1998), American baseball player
- Christa C. Mayer Thurman (born 1934), German-born American curator, art historian
- Dennis Thurman (born 1956), American football player and coach
- Dovie Thurman (1946–1997), American community activist in Chicago
- Ernestine Hogan Basham Thurman (1920–1987), American entomologist and researcher
- Howard Thurman (1899–1981), African-American theologian and civil rights leader
- Jameer Thurman (born 1995), American football player
- James D. Thurman (born 1953), American general
- John Thurman (disambiguation)
- Judith Thurman (born 1946), American writer, biographer and critic
- Junior Thurman (born 1964), American football player
- Karen Thurman (born 1951), American politician
- Keith Thurman (born 1988), American boxer
- Lucy Thurman (1849–1918), temperance activist and president of the National Association of Colored Women
- Maxwell R. Thurman (1931–1995), United States Army general and Vice Chief of Staff
- Mike Thurman (born 1973), American baseball player
- Nick Thurman (born 1995), American football player
- Odell Thurman (born 1983), American football player
- Rob Thurman, American novelist
- Robert Thurman (1941–2026), American Buddhism scholar
- Roy Thurman (1924–2004), United States Army lieutenant general
- Samuel Thurman (1913–1995), American law professor
- Scotty Thurman (born 1974), American basketball player
- Sue Bailey Thurman (1903–1996), American author, historian and civil rights activist
- Tony Thurman (born 1962), American college football player
- Uma Thurman (born 1970), American actress
- Wallace Thurman (1902–1934), African-American novelist and screenwriter
- William E. Thurman (born 1931), United States Air Force general
- William Sims Thurman, (1931–2019) American classicist
- William T. Thurman (1908–2001), American lawyer, professor and politician from Wyoming

== Given name ==
- Thurman Arnold (1891–1969), American lawyer
- Thurman C. Crook (1891–1981), American politician
- Thurman "Fum" McGraw (1927–2000), American football player
- Thurman Munson (1947–1979), American baseball player
- Thurman Thomas (born 1966), American football player
- Thurman Tucker (1917–1993), American baseball player

== See also ==
- Therman (disambiguation)
- General Thurman (disambiguation)
- Thurmann (disambiguation)
- Thurmond (disambiguation)
