= Therman =

Therman may refer to:

== People with the given name ==
- Therman "Sonny" Fisher (1931–2005), American rockabilly singer, songwriter, and guitarist
- Therman Ruth (1914–2002), American vaudevillian, gospel singer, deejay and concert promoter (also known by Thurman and Thermon)
- Therman Statom (born 1953), American glass artist

== People with the surname ==
- Eeva Therman (1916–2004), Finnish-born American geneticist
- Mattias Therman (born 1974), Finnish businessman and rally driver

== See also ==
- Thurman
- Thurmann (disambiguation)
- Thurmond (disambiguation)
