= General Thurman =

General Thurman may refer to:

- James D. Thurman (born 1953), U.S. Army general
- Maxwell R. Thurman (1931–1995), U.S. Army general
- Roy Thurman (1924–2004), U.S. Army lieutenant general
- William E. Thurman (born 1931), U.S. Air Force lieutenant general
