= David E. Ott =

US Army lieutenant general (1922–2004)

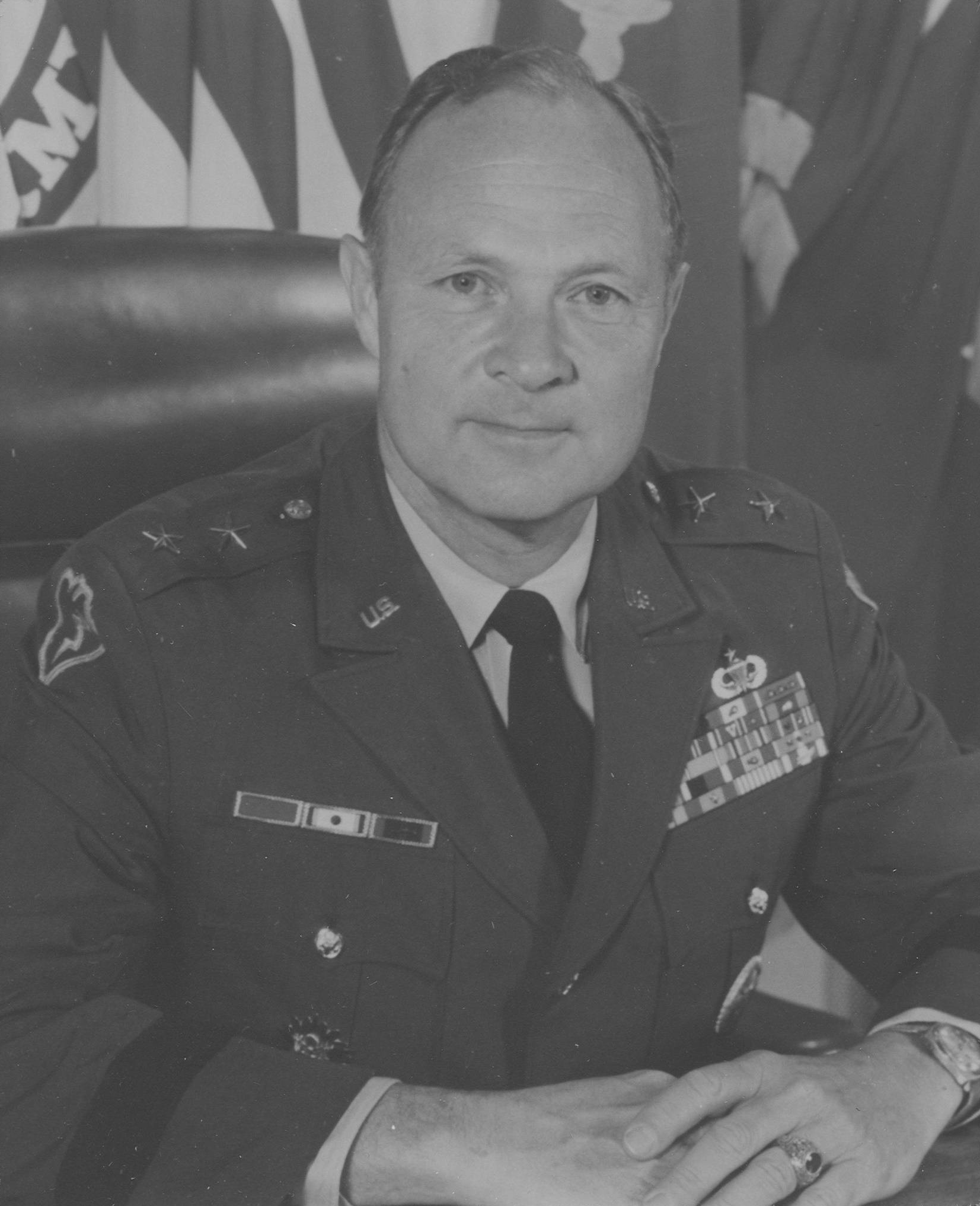
- Ott as commandant of the Field Artillery School c. 1974
- Born: 31 July 1922; Schofield Barracks, Hawaii Territory, US
- Died: 21 June 2004 (aged 81); Washington, DC, US
- Burial place: Arlington National Cemetery
- Education: United States Military Academy; US Army Command and General Staff College; US Army War College; George Washington University
- Spouse: Joyce Gardiner Helmick (m. 1950–2004)
- Children: 4
- Military career
- Service: United States Army
- Service years: 1944–1978
- Rank: Lieutenant General
- Service number: 026522
- Unit: US Army Field Artillery Branch
- Commands: Provisional Battery, 868th Field Artillery Battalion; 2nd Battalion, 83rd Field Artillery Regiment; 25th Infantry Division Artillery; US Army Field Artillery Branch; United States Army Support, Thailand; Secretary of Defense Task Force; US Army Field Artillery School; US VII Corps
- Wars: World War II; Korean War; Vietnam War
- Awards: Army Distinguished Service Medal (3); Legion of Merit (4); Bronze Star Medal (2); Distinguished Flying Cross; Air Medal (6); Army Commendation Medal
- Other work: Consultant, Teledyne Technologies

David E. Ott (31 July 1922 – 21 June 2004) was a career officer in the United States Army. A veteran of World War II, Korean War, and Vietnam War, he served from 1944 to 1978 and attained the rank of lieutenant general. Ott's commands included the US Army Field Artillery School and US VII Corps, and his decorations included three awards of the Army Distinguished Service Medal, four awards of the Legion of Merit, two awards of the Bronze Star Medal (one with "V" for valor), the Distinguished Flying Cross, six awards of the Air Medal, and the Army Commendation Medal.

Ott was born at Schofield Barracks during his father's military career and attended schools in several states as his family traveled for his father's army assignments. He graduated from the United States Military Academy (West Point) in 1944 and served in Europe during the closing days of World War II. Subsequent assignments included the faculty at the Field Artillery School and executive officer of a battalion during the Korean War. He graduated from the United States Army Command and General Staff College in 1957 and his subsequent postings included command of 2nd Battalion, 83rd Field Artillery Regiment. In 1963, he graduated from the United States Army War College and received a Master of Arts degree from George Washington University. He served in the Vietnam War in the mid-1960s, including assignment as commander of 25th Infantry Division Artillery.

Ott's later career included assignment as chief of the Field Artillery Branch and commander of United States Army Support, Thailand. In the early 1970s, he was director of the Secretary of Defense task force that planned the handover of the Vietnam War to the South Vietnamese military and the US military's departure from South Vietnam. From 1973 to 1976, he was commandant of the Field Artillery School. In 1976, he was promoted to lieutenant general and assigned to command the US VII Corps. After his 1978 army retirement, Ott was a consultant for Teledyne Technologies.

== Early life ==
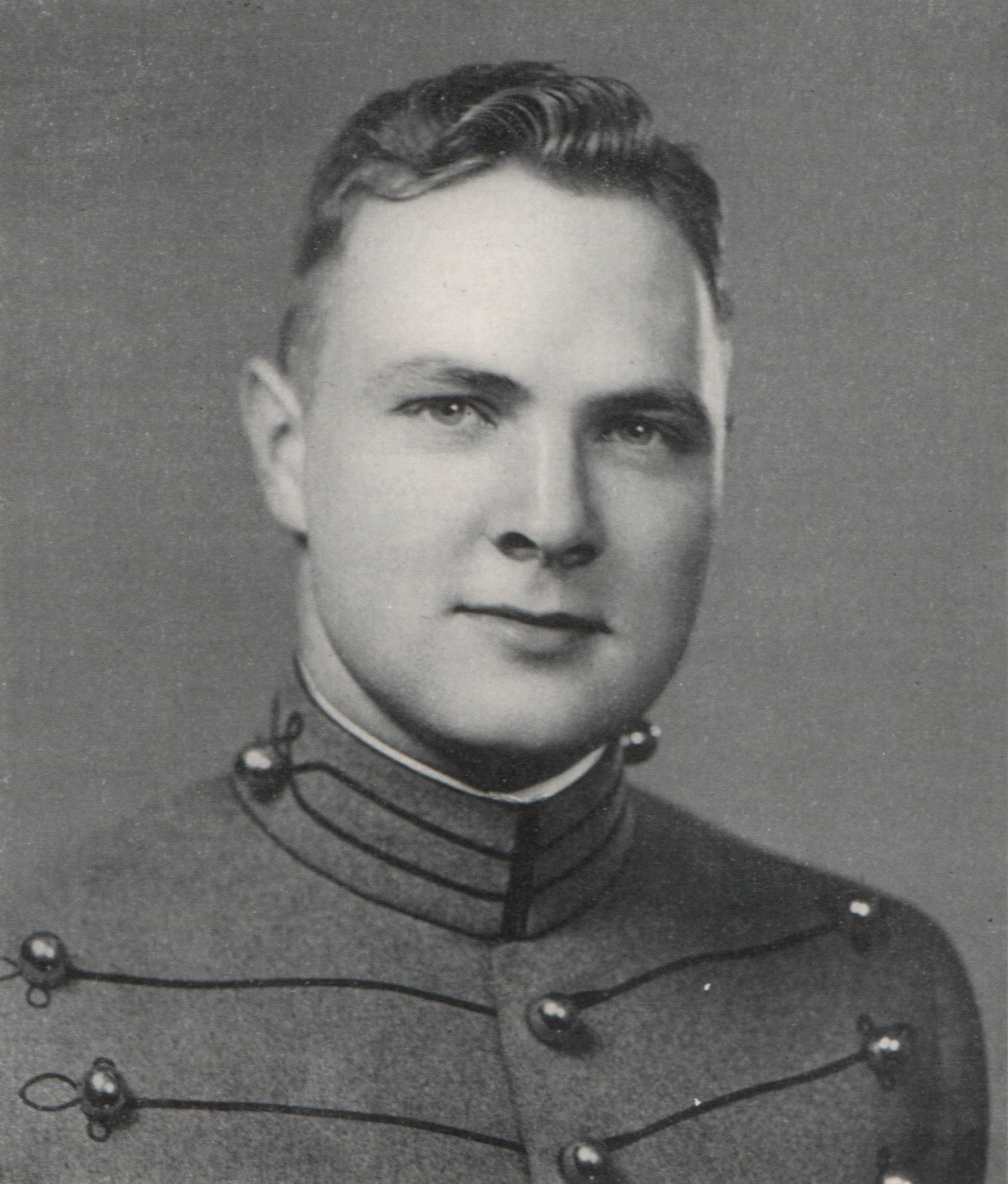
Ott as a West Point senior in 1944

David Ewing Ott was born at Schofield Barracks, Hawaii Territory on 31 July 1922, a son of Brigadier General Edward Stanley Ott Sr. and Denise Maria (Koch) Ott. He was educated at schools in Kansas, Washington, DC, and Georgia as the Ott family moved for his father's career, and he was a 1939 graduate of Columbus High School in Columbus, Georgia. After high school, Ott attended Auburn University until 1941, when he received an appointment to the United States Military Academy at West Point from Senator Theodore G. Bilbo. Originally enrolled as a member of the class of 1945, the outbreak of World War II caused West Point to accelerate its academic program, and Ott graduated in 1944 ranked 51st of 474. At graduation, he received his commission as a second lieutenant of Field Artillery.

== Start of career ==
After receiving his commission, Ott attended the Officer Basic Course at the Fort Sill, Oklahoma Field Artillery School. In early 1945, he was assigned to the 868th Field Artillery Battalion, a unit of the 65th Infantry Division. He served in European theatre during the closing months of the Second World War, including command of a provisional battery of British 25 pounders, and in April 1945 he received the Bronze Star Medal with "V" device for valor. After VE Day, he remained in Europe and served in Field Artillery assignments until being assigned to the Intelligence staff section (G-2) at Headquarters, US Army European Command. In 1947, Ott completed the course at the US Army Airborne School and received his parachutist badge.

After receiving his parachutist badge, Ott was assigned to the Field Artillery School faculty, where he was an instructor in gunnery until 1951. In 1950, he married Joyce Gardiner Helmick, the daughter of Major General Charles G. Helmick and granddaughter of Major General Eli Alva Helmick. They were married until her death in April 2004 and were the parents of four children. In 1952, Ott graduated from the Field Artillery Officer Advanced Course. He was then assigned to Korean War service with the 25th Infantry Division's 64th Field Artillery Battalion; during this wartime service, he was assigned first as the battalion's operations officer (S-3) and later as its executive officer and second-in-command.

== Continued career ==
After returning from Korea, Ott was assigned to the operations division (G-3) on the staff at the United States Department of the Army. In 1956 he began attendance at the United States Army Command and General Staff College, from which he graduated in 1957. After completing the staff college course, Ott was assigned to Fort Bragg, North Carolina, where he served as operations officer (S3) for the 82nd Airborne Division Artillery. In 1959, Ott was assigned to West Germany as commander of 2nd Battalion, 83rd Field Artillery Regiment. After a year in command, he was assigned to the staff of Seventh Army, where he served for two years. In 1962, he was assigned as a student at the United States Army War College, and he graduated in 1963. His next posting was to MacDill Air Force Base, Florida, where he was assigned as a plans officer at the headquarters of the United States Strike Command. In 1963, he received a Master of Arts degree from George Washington University.

In 1964, Ott was assigned to Vietnam War duty and served as executive officer of II Field Force Artillery. After six months in this role, he was assigned to command the 25th Infantry Division Artillery. Upon returning to the United States, Ott was appointed as chief of the Field Artillery Branch; in this assignment, he was responsible for organizing Field Artillery and Air Defense Artillery into separate branches. In 1969, Ott was promoted to brigadier general and assigned to command United States Army Support, Thailand, which provide Vietnam War logistics, communications, engineering, and security support for US Air Force bases in Thailand, as well as covert operations in Laos.

== Later career ==
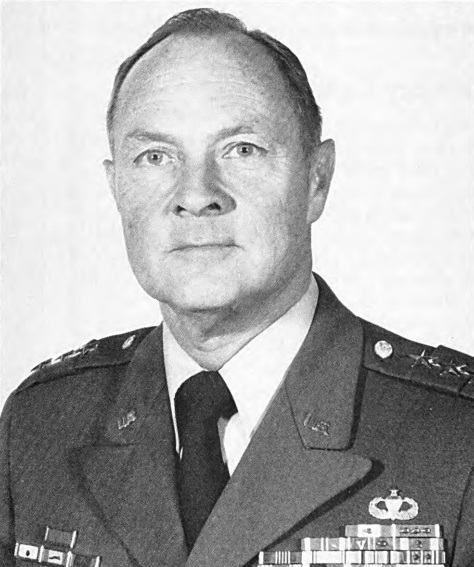
Ott in 1976 as commandant of the Field Artillery School

Upon returning from Thailand, Ott was assigned as deputy assistant chief of staff in the Intelligence (G-2) directorate of the Army staff. His next assignment was director of the Secretary of Defense Task Force, which was organized to plan the US withdrawal from South Vietnam. In 1973, Ott was assigned as commandant of the Field Artillery School, where he played a major role in the branch's post-Vietnam War doctrine and education revisions. In 1976, he was promoted to lieutenant general and assigned as commander of US VII Corps in West Germany. Ott retired from the army in 1978.

After his retirement from the military, Ott was employed as a consultant with Teledyne Technologies. He lived at Fort Belvoir, Virginia. during his retirement and organized the DC area chapter of the US Army Field Artillery Association. He later served as the association's president and chairman of the board. Ott wrote numerous articles for magazines and professional journals, and was the author of the book Field Artillery, 1954-1973. In addition, he served as chairman of the board for the Army Distaff Foundation, and in this position he worked to expand life care facilities for military retirees and spouses in northern Virginia and in San Antonio, Texas. As a volunteer interested in military family readiness, he organized the first Army Family Symposium. Ott died in Washington, DC on 21 June 2004. He was buried at Arlington National Cemetery.

== Awards ==
Ott's decorations included the Army Distinguished Service Medal with two oak leaf clusters, the Legion of Merit with three oak leaf clusters, the Bronze Star Medal with one oak leaf cluster and one "V" device for valor, the Distinguished Flying Cross, the Air Medal with numeral 6, and the Army Commendation Medal. His foreign decorations included the Grand Cross with Star and Sash of the Order of Merit of the Federal Republic of Germany and the Vietnamese Gallantry Cross with gold star.

== Dates of rank ==
- Second Lieutenant (Regular Army), 6 June 1944
- First Lieutenant (Army of the United States), 1 March 1945
- Captain (Army of the United States), 18 March 1946
- First Lieutenant (Regular Army), 6 June 1947
- Captain (Regular Army), 6 June 1947
- Major (Regular Army), 4 September 1957
- Lieutenant Colonel (Army of the United States), 8 April 1959
- Lieutenant Colonel (Regular Army), 8 June 1965
- Colonel (Army of the United States), 8 November 1965
- Colonel (Regular Army), 19 July 1968
- Brigadier General (Army of the United States), 26 December 1968
- Brigadier General (Regular Army), 24 July 1970
- Major General (Regular Army), 4 June 1971
- Lieutenant General (Regular Army), 17 September 1976
