= Thurmond (surname) =

Thurmond is a surname.

Notable people with the name include:

- Aretha Thurmond (born 1976), American discus thrower
- Chris Thurmond (born 1953), American football coach
- J. M. Thurmond (1836–1882), mayor of Dallas, Texas from 1879–1880
- James Strom Thurmond Jr. (born 1972), American politician, son of Strom Thurmond
- Mark Thurmond (born 1956), American baseball pitcher
- Mike Thurmond (born 1953), American school district superintendent and politician
- Nate Thurmond (1941–2016), American basketball player
- Paul Thurmond (born 1976), American politician, son of Strom Thurmond
- Sarah Thurmond (died 1762), English actress
- Strom Thurmond (1902–2003), American senator
- Walter Thurmond (born 1987), American football player who plays cornerback in the National Football League

== See also ==
- Thurmond House (disambiguation)
- Thurman (disambiguation)
