= Thumann =

Thumann is a German surname. Notable people with the surname include:

- Anton Thumann (1912–1946), German SS-Obersturmführer and Nazi concentration camp personnel
- Harry Thumann (1952–2001), German electronic composer, record producer and sound engineer
- Karl Borromäus Thumann (1820–1874), German theologian and vicar general
- Paul Thumann (1834–1908), German illustrator and painter

== See also ==
- Thurmann (disambiguation)
- Klaus Thunemann (1937–2025), German bassoonist
