= Thurmond =

Thurmond may refer to:

== People ==
- Thurmond (surname), including a list of people with the name

== Places ==
- Thurmond, North Carolina
- Thurmond, West Virginia
  - Thurmond (Amtrak station)

== See also ==
- Thurmond House (disambiguation)
- Thurman (disambiguation)
