= Thurmann =

Thurmann may refer to:

- 42191 Thurmann, a main-belt asteroid
- Karl Thurmann (1909–1943), German U-boat commander
- Thurmann (family name), a Norwegian family name

== See also ==
- Thurman (disambiguation)
- Thumann, people with this surname
