= Charles G. Helmick =

American military officer (1892–1991)

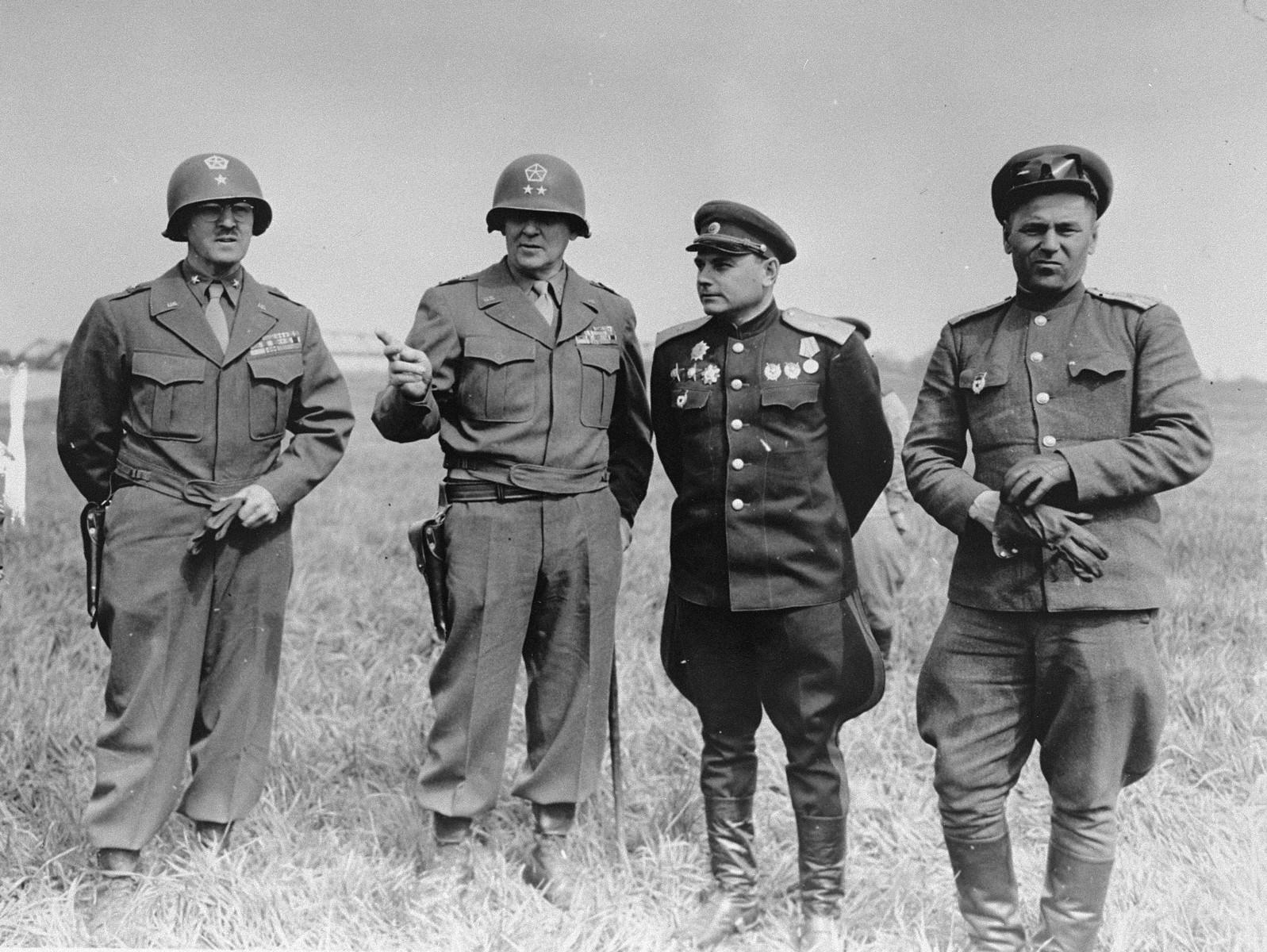
- Helmick (at left) meeting with American and Soviet generals on Elbe Day, April 25, 1945
- Born: Charles Gardiner Helmick; July 7, 1892; Fort Sherman, Idaho, United States
- Died: December 19, 1991 (aged 99); Alexandria, Virginia, United States
- Education: United States Naval Academy
- Military career
- Allegiance: United States
- Branch: United States Army
- Service years: 1913–1952
- Rank: Major General
- Commands: V Corps Artillery; Fort George Meade
- Conflicts: Border War; World War I; World War II; Operation Overlord; Siegfried Line campaign; Battle of the Bulge; Western Allied invasion of Germany; Operation Blacklist Forty; Korean War
- Awards: Distinguished Service Medal

Charles Gardiner Helmick (July 7, 1892 – December 19, 1991) was an American military officer who served in World War I, World War II, and the Korean War.

== Early life and career ==
A military brat, Helmick was born at Fort Sherman, Idaho. His father, Major General Eli Alva Helmick (1863–1945) served as a commander in both the Spanish–American War and World War I.

Charles Helmick entered the United States Naval Academy at Annapolis in 1909. After completing his studies, Helmick was unexpectedly commissioned in the United States Army, as a Second lieutenant. He saw service on the Mexican border before being sent to France with the 15th Field Artillery Regiment in 1918. After the war was over, Helmick served stateside on a number of Field Artillery posts.

== World War II ==
In June 1941, Helmick was transferred to the Army of the United States and assigned the rank of Colonel, serving as chief of the Budget Branch of the Department of War's General Staff. Later, he would serve as division artillery commander of the 35th Infantry Division.

In 1944, Helmick, now a Brigadier General, was made artillery commander of V Corps and participated in the Battle of Normandy. He led the naval bombardment of Omaha Beach, allowing for shore batteries to be established by American troops. He then commanded on the Siegfried Line and during the Battle of the Bulge. On April 25, 1945, Helmick took part in the meeting between American and Soviet forces in Torgau on the Elbe River. The following day, Helmick and Major General Clarence Huebner of V Corps met with Red Army Generals Gleb Baklanov and Vladimir Rusakov.

Following the end of the war, Helmick was awarded the Army Distinguished Service Medal for "exceptionally meritorious and distinguished services to the Government of the United States, in a duty of great responsibility as V Corps Artillery Commander during the campaigns of Ardennes, Rhineland, and Central Europe, December 1944 to May 1945."

After returning from Europe, Helmick became the commander of Fort George Meade. In 1948 he was called to South Korea by General John R. Hodge to partake in Operation Blacklist Forty as deputy military governor. During his tenure, Helmick oversaw the U.S. purchase of Japanese property in Korea to be sold to the Korean government of Syngman Rhee. After returning from Korea, Helmick became a stateside commander of First Army forces, before retiring with the rank of Major General in 1952.

== Personal life and death ==
Helmick suffered from color blindness his entire life. In 1919 he married Leah Louise Stock (1892–1981), with whom he had 3 children. His daughter Joyce Gardiner Helmick was the wife of Lieutenant General David E. Ott. He died on December 19, 1991, aged 99.
