= John Thurman =

John Thurman may refer to:

- John Thurman (Scouter) (1911–1985), British Scouter
- John Thurman (American football) (1900–1976), American football player
- John E. Thurman (1919–1983), member of the California State Assembly
- John R. Thurman (1814–1854), U.S. Representative from New York
- John R. Thurman III (1924–2004), U.S. Army lieutenant general
