= Columbus High School (Columbus, Georgia) =

Public high school in Columbus, Georgia, United States

Columbus High School Liberal Arts Magnet

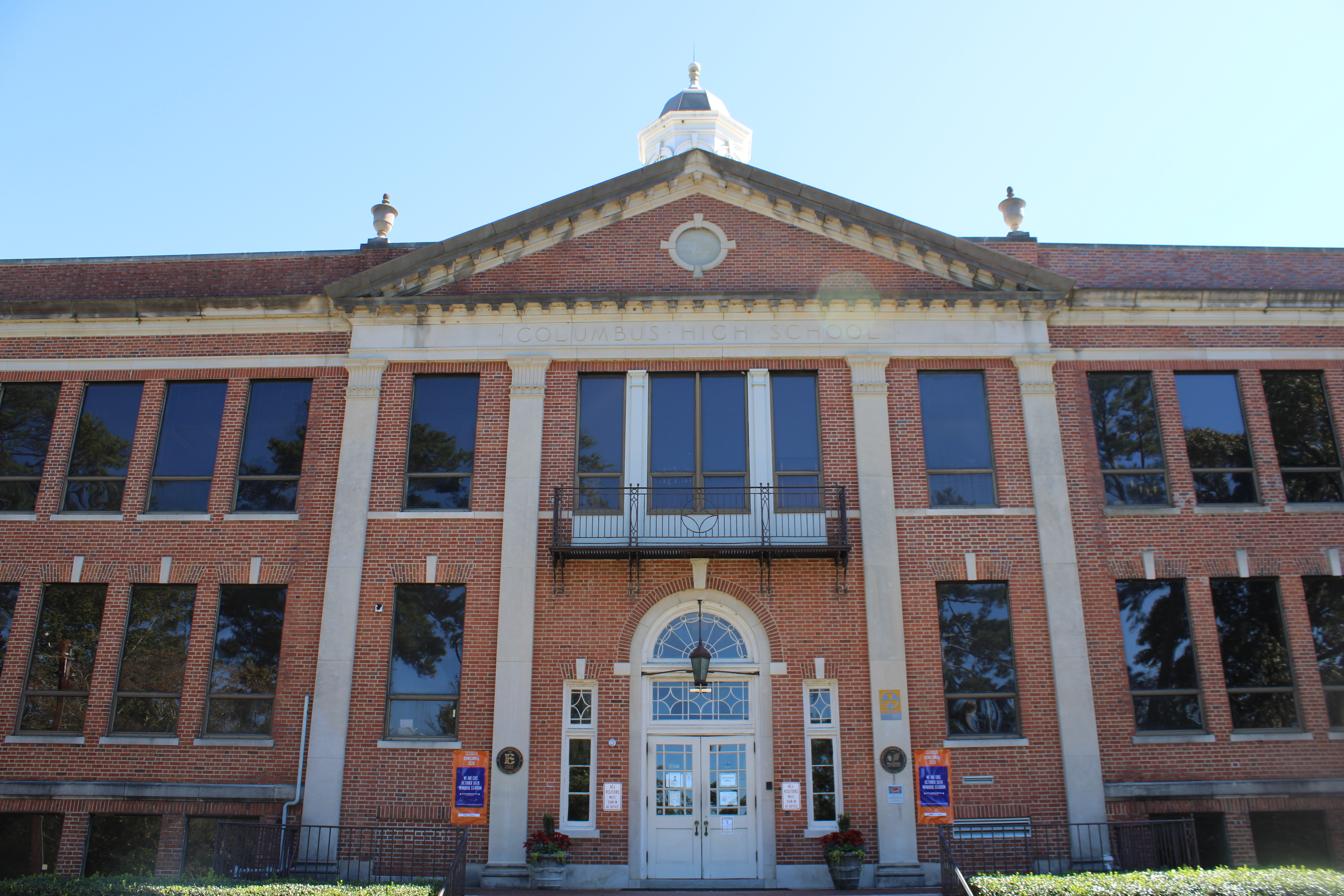

Location
- 1700 Cherokee Ave. Columbus, Georgia 31906; United States; 32°28′46″N 84°57′48″W

Information
- Type: Public magnet school for the liberal arts
- Established: 1890
- Principal: Sonya Allen
- Faculty: 61.00 (on an FTE basis)
- Enrollment: 1,131 (2023–2024)
- Student to teacher ratio: 18.54
- Colors: Orange and blue
- Mascot: Blue Devil
- Information: (706) 748–2534
- Partners in Education: AFLAC
- Website: Columbus High School

Columbus High School (CHS) is a public high school located in Columbus, Georgia, United States. It serves as one of the Muscogee County School District's liberal arts magnet schools. It opened in 1890.

In 2025, Columbus High School (CHS) ranked second in the state of Georgia, 78th in the nation, and 1st amongst local Muscogee County High Schools according to U.S. News & World Report.

== History ==
Columbus High School began in 1890 at a building known as the Female Academy located at 10th Street and 2nd Avenue in downtown Columbus, Georgia. There were 20 students in the first graduating class in 1892, 3 boys and 17 girls. In 1898, the school moved to its first exclusive building (a two-story, red brick structure) at 11th Street and 4th Avenue and remained at that location until 1927. By that time, the graduating class had grown to a total of 90 students (28 boys and 62 girls). In the early 1900s, three alternative educational tracts were offered at CHS, college preparatory, classical and scientific. In 1913, the first COHISCAN, the CHS annual yearbook, was published. The name is derived from COlumbus HIgh SChool ANnual.

In 1919, the school supported athletic teams including girls’ basketball team and boys’ football and basketball. In 1923, the “Blue Devil” name was first used when General John J. Pershing referred to a spirited football team playing against Phillips High School in Birmingham, Alabama. He stated that the team played like devils in winning the game. Previous to that time, several nicknames had been used for CHS sports teams, one of them was “Orange Avalanche.”

In 1924, a bond referendum was approved to build a new high school. The 11th street location had become too small to accommodate the growing population of the city, especially after Camp Benning (now Fort Benning) brought an influx of new people to Columbus during and following World War I. Sixteen acres in Wildwood Park was selected as the site for the new location for Columbus High School. The respected New York Architectural firm of Starrett and van Vleck, working with local architects, designed the building and the surrounding area. The cornerstone was laid on September 2, 1925 at 1600 Cherokee Avenue and the dedication ceremony was held on September 16, 1926. The first graduating class from the new high school was in 1928. On June 12, 1981, the building was burned and it was later determined to be the result of arson; however, no one was ever arrested. The fire began where the school records were stored and much of the early records of CHS were destroyed. The school was rebuilt, and on August 27, 1983, a re-dedication ceremony was held for the reconstructed building.

In 2001, CHS became a total magnet school and continues as such today.

In school years 2004-2005, CHS was named a Georgia School of Excellence and a National Blue Ribbon School and has been awarded gold status each year since as one of the best high schools in Georgia and the nation. In 2017, CHS shared the ranking as the top (#1) high school in the state of Georgia, #21 nationwide for magnet high schools, and #83 nationwide in overall high schools by U.S. News & World Report.

== Statistics/Rankings ==
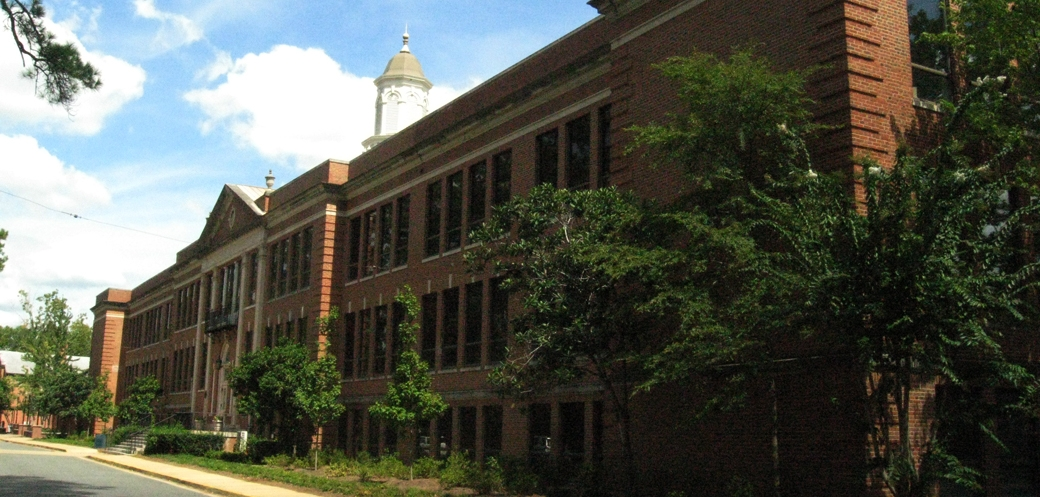
Columbus High School today

Columbus High School's overall performance is higher than 99% of schools in the state of Georgia, its academic growth is higher than 94% of schools in the state, and its four-year graduation rate is 99.6%, which is higher than 99% of high schools in the state of Georgia. CHS students have a college readiness index of 85.8%, with Mathematics and English proficiencies at 88 and 84 percents, respectively - more than twice the state average.

In 2017, CHS was ranked #4 in the state of Georgia for "Best Teachers".

In 2018, CHS ranked third in the state of Georgia, 105th in the nation, and 21st among magnet schools in the nation by U.S. News & World Report.

CHS' student body makeup is 40% male and 60% female, and the total minority enrollment is 42%.

== Graduation requirements ==
All Liberal Arts College Preparatory Magnet students entering the program as 9th graders must earn a total of 32 Carnegie units. To stay in the magnet program, a student must maintain at least a "C" average in any taken course. Failure to do so can result in the removal of the student from Columbus High School, the one exception being for freshmen who fail during their first semester, as the transition to high school may be overwhelming. Students take one core course each year in English, math, science, and social studies.

Course type	Credits needed
English	4 units
Foreign Language	3 units
Math	4 units
Science	4 units
Social Studies	4 units
Physical Education	1/2 unit
Health	1/2 unit
Humanities	1 unit
Academic electives	3 units
Student choice electives	6 units
Fine arts electives	1 unit

=== Community involvement ===
Each year, freshmen, sophomores, and juniors complete 20 hours of community service with a local non-profit organization. Seniors obtain hours through a Senior Project or AP Research Project. The senior project requires students to pick an activity they have never tried before, work 50 hours alongside a mentor, and maintain a portfolio documenting their progress from the summer before senior year up until the final presentation at Board's Night (usually in April) when they present their project to a panel of judges.

=== Eligibility ===
Students qualify for entrance into the program based on:

- 8th-grade course averages of 80 or better, with the exception of algebra and foreign languages
- Recommendations from middle school counselor, math, and English teachers
- Entrance exams performance in math, reading, and composition
- Students must maintain a "C" average in each academic course, with the exception of one "F" allowed in the first semester of freshman year.

== Location ==
The school sits atop a hill in the Lakebottom area of the city and across Cherokee Avenue from Lakebottom/Weracoba Park, where the school shares athletic facilities with the Columbus Parks and Recreation Department.

== Discipline ==
Students are required to wear ID cards around their necks at all times during school hours. This serves as the students' library card and can only be removed at the end of the day once off of school property.

== Activities ==
Students can spend their time out of class in the following extracurricular activities.

=== Athletics ===
Columbus High School is ranked fourth (2004) in AAAA schools in Georgia. The school is rated 5A by student population. Two-thirds of the students participate in one or more of 41 teams:

- Boys'/girls' cross country
- Boys'/girls' track
- Boys'/girls' basketball
- Boys'/girls' tennis
- Boys'/girls' golf
- Boys'/girls' soccer
- Baseball
- Football
- Marching Band - Drumline/Colorguard
- JROTC Drill Team
- JROTC Colorguard
- JROTC Raiders
- Swim team
- Softball
- Cheerleading (competition, football, and basketball)
- Wrestling
- Rifle Team
- Girls' volleyball
- Girls' lacrosse

==== GHSA Class AAAA State Champions ====
- Baseball - 1984, 1991, 1992, 1994, 1995, 1996, 2000, 2004, 2005, 2010, 2011, 2012
- Girls' Basketball - 2017
- Cheerleading - 2008, 2010
- Boys' Cross country - 1999
- Girls' Cross country - 2008, 2010
- Boys' Golf - 1945, 1946, 1947, 1948, 1955, 1958, 1967, 1972, 2010, 2011, 2016, 2018
- Girls' Golf - 1999, 2000, 2001, 2002, 2003, 2005, 2006, 2014, 2017
- Literary - 2010, 2014, 2015, 2016, 2017, 2018
- One Act Competition - 2003, 2006, 2007, 2012, 2016, 2018
- Softball - 2009
- Boys' Tennis - 2013
- Girls' Tennis - 2016
- Boys' Track - 1967
- Volleyball - 2007, 2013, 2015
- Wrestling - 2006, 2023, 2024

=== Fine arts ===
The program includes chorus, drama, band, and orchestra. At CHS the drama department or "Full House Productions" usually produces a one-act show that is used to compete in a local competition, and a spring musical. In the theater department the two acting classes also each produce their own class showcase in the form of a play.

=== Publications ===
The school annual is written by students as part of a yearbook class. It title is the COHISCAN (COlumbus HIgh SChool ANnual).

== Notable alumni ==
Notable alumni from Columbus High School include the following:

- Reggie Abercrombie, Major League professional baseball player
- Dan Amos, class of 1969, Chairman and CEO of AFLAC
- Bill Jordan, class of 1969, professional outdoorsman, designer/founder of the Realtree camouflage brand, and host of Realtree Outdoors
- Essang Bassey, Wake Forest cornerback
- James Ryan Haywood, Voice Actor and Member of Online Entertainment Group Achievement Hunter.
- Garey Ingram, Major League professional baseball player, current AA hitting coach for the Mississippi Braves
- Nunnally Johnson, class of 1915, screenwriter and filmmaker
- Charity Lawson, class of 2014, star of season 20 of The Bachelorette
- Carson McCullers, class of 1933, writer
- John McNally, class of 1974, pistol marksman, member of the '84, '88, '92, '96 and 2000 Olympic teams
- Sam Mitchell, NBA player and head coach
- Skeeter Newsome, former professional baseball player (Philadelphia Athletics, Boston Red Sox, Philadelphia Phillies)
- David E. Ott, class of 1939, US Army lieutenant general
- Kim Porter, American model, singer, actress, entrepreneur.
- Ketia Swanier, WNBA basketball player (Phoenix Mercury)
- Frank Thomas, class of 1986, Major League professional baseball player Inducted into Baseball Hall of Fame in 2014.
- Jordan Weems, Professional Baseball Player for Washington Nationals
