= Clarence R. Huebner =

United States Army general

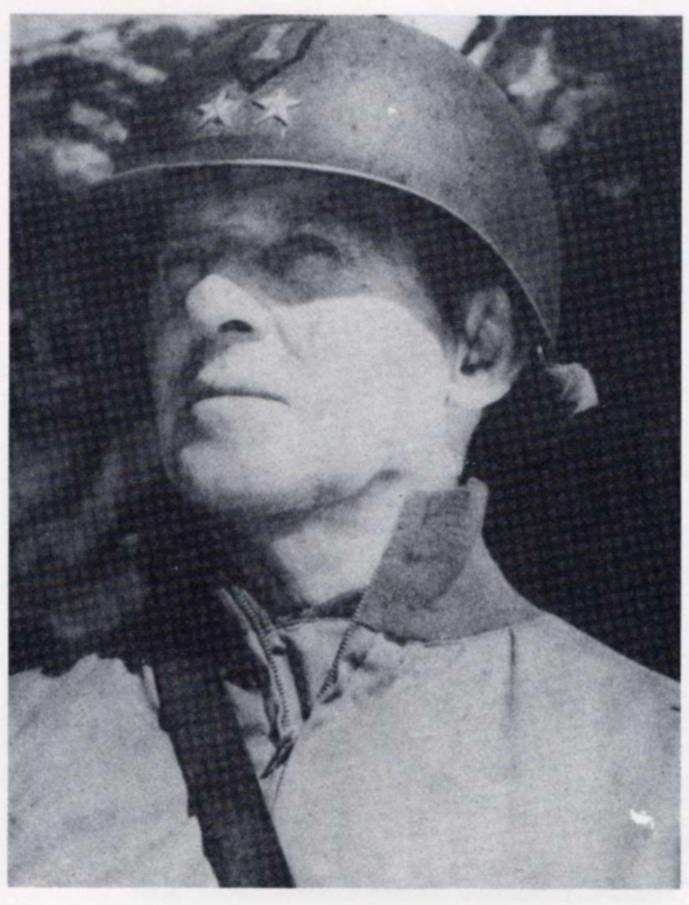
- Born: November 24, 1888; Bushton, Kansas, United States
- Died: September 23, 1972 (aged 83); Washington, D.C., United States
- Burial place: Arlington National Cemetery
- Military career
- Allegiance: United States
- Branch: United States Army
- Service years: 1908–1950
- Rank: Lieutenant General
- Service number: 0-4552
- Units: Infantry Branch
- Commands: United States Army Europe; V Corps; 1st Infantry Division; 28th Infantry Regiment; 2nd Battalion, 28th Infantry Regiment
- Conflicts: World War I World War II
- Awards: Distinguished Service Cross (2); Army Distinguished Service Medal (3); Silver Star; Legion of Merit; Bronze Star Medal; Purple Heart (2)

Lieutenant General Clarence Ralph Huebner (November 24, 1888 – September 23, 1972) was a highly decorated senior officer of the United States Army who saw distinguished active service during both World War I and World War II. Perhaps his most notable role was as the Commanding General (CG) of the 1st Infantry Division (nicknamed "The Big Red One") during the Normandy landings of World War II. From January 1945, through the end of World War II, Huebner commanded V Corps (United States).

== World War I ==
A farm boy from Bushton, Kansas, who spent almost seven years serving from private to sergeant in the 18th Infantry Regiment, Huebner received a regular commission in November 1916.

During World War I Huebner served on the Western Front and was sent to France with his regiment, the 28th Infantry, which later became part of the 1st Infantry Division ("The Big Red One"), shortly after the American entry into World War I. The division was the first of the American Expeditionary Force (AEF) to be sent overseas during the war. The following year he participated in the first American regimental assault at Cantigny, through Soissons, Saint-Mihiel, and the Meuse-Argonne. For his service in this war, he received two Distinguished Service Crosses, an Army Distinguished Service Medal, and a Silver Star. He commanded the 2nd Battalion, 28th Infantry at Cantigny after his commanding officer was killed, and later commanded the regiment, one of the youngest regimental commanders in the AEF.

Remaining in the army after the war, Huebner attended the United States Army Command and General Staff School at Fort Leavenworth in 1924 and served on its faculty from 1929 to 1933.

== World War II ==
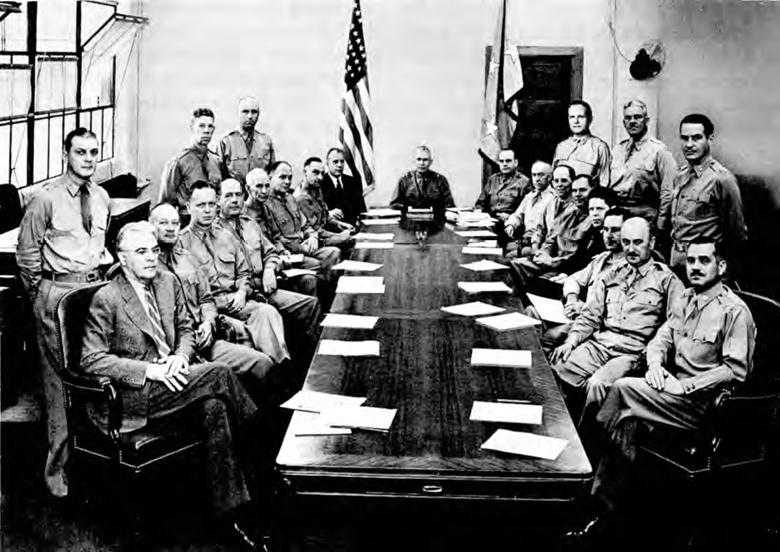
Weekly Staff Conference at United States Army Services of Supply (USASOS) headquarters in June 1942. Brigadier General Clarence R. Huebner is seated, sixth from the right.

=== Division command ===
In 1943, Huebner relieved the popular commander of the 1st Infantry Division, General Terry Allen, in a move engineered by General Omar N. Bradley. While the 1st Infantry Division had enjoyed considerable combat success under Allen's leadership, Bradley was highly critical of both Allen and assistant division commander Theodore Roosevelt Jr.'s wartime leadership style, which favored fighting ability over drill and discipline: "While the Allies were parading decorously through Tunis," Bradley wrote, "Allen's brawling 1st Infantry Division was celebrating the Tunisian victory in a manner all its own. In towns from Tunisia all the way to Arzew, the division had left a trail of looted wine shops and outraged mayors. But it was in Oran...that the division really ran amuck. The trouble began when SOS (Services of Supply) troops, long stationed in Oran, closed their clubs and installations to our combat troops from the front. Irritated by this exclusion, the 1st Division swarmed into town to 'liberate' it a second time." Despite this, Bradley admitted that "none excelled the unpredictable Terry Allen in the leadership of troops."

Upon assuming command, Huebner immediately ordered a series of close-order drills, parades, and weapons instruction for the 1st Infantry Division, including its veterans, who had just finished a bloody series of engagements with German forces in Sicily. This did not endear him to the enlisted men of the division, who made no attempt to hide their preference for Allen. As one of the men of the Big Red One said in disgust, "Hell's bells! We've been killing Germans for months and now they are teaching us to shoot a rifle? It doesn't make any sense."

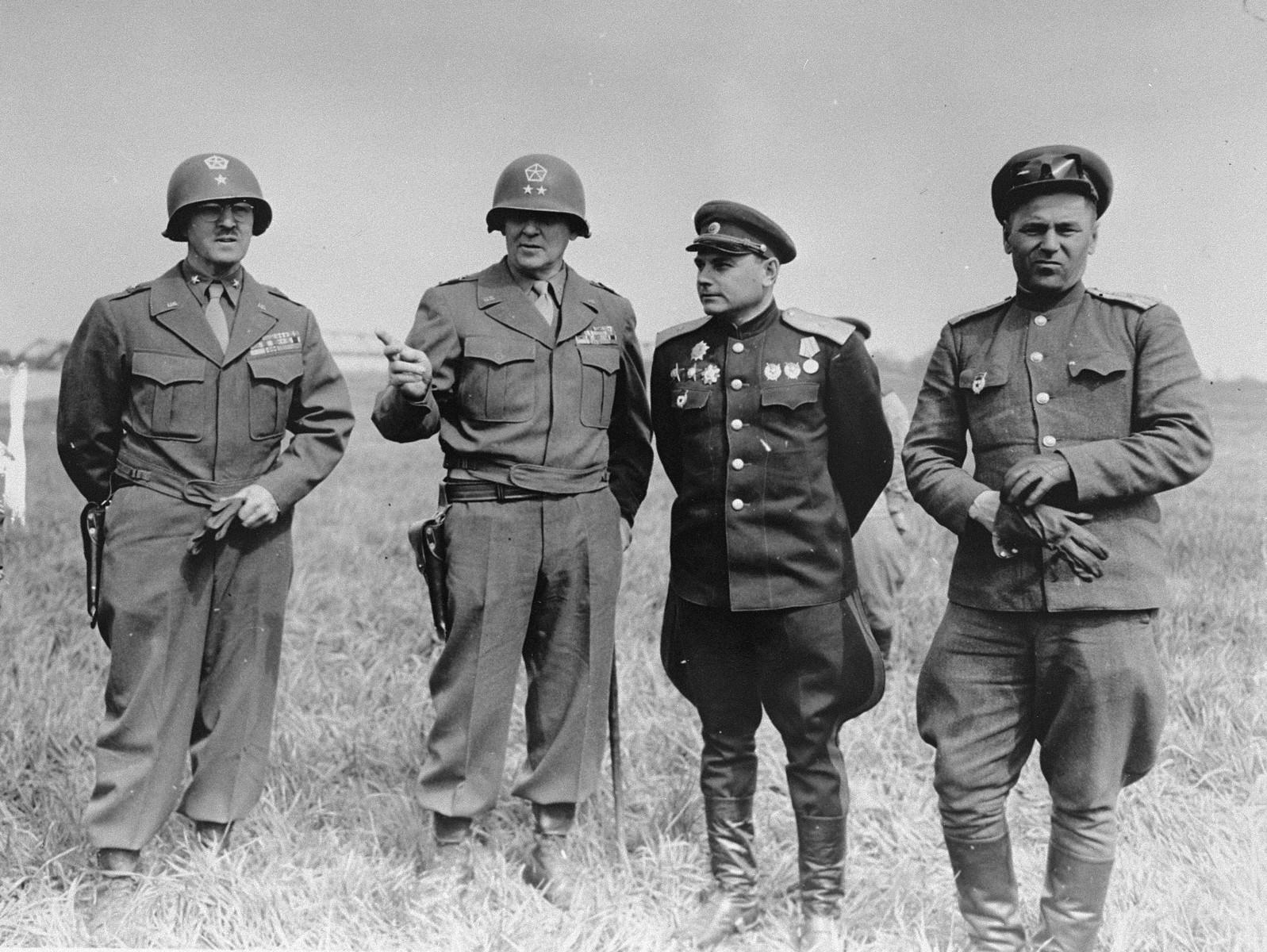
American and Soviet generals pose on the banks of the Elbe River near Torgau, Germany, where the two Allies linked up for the first time in 1945. Pictured from left to right are Charles G. Helmick, Clarence R. Huebner, Gleb Baklanov, Vladimir Rusakov.

Supported by Bradley and Eisenhower, Huebner persisted, and the morale of the division gradually recovered. Huebner, aided by Brigadier General Willard G. Wyman, his assistant division commander, led the division in the assault on Omaha Beach on D-Day, followed by a successful infantry attack at Saint-Lô. The division would later repel a German counteroffensive at Mortain, and pursue the German Army across France, culminating in the Battles of Aachen and the Huertgen Forest.

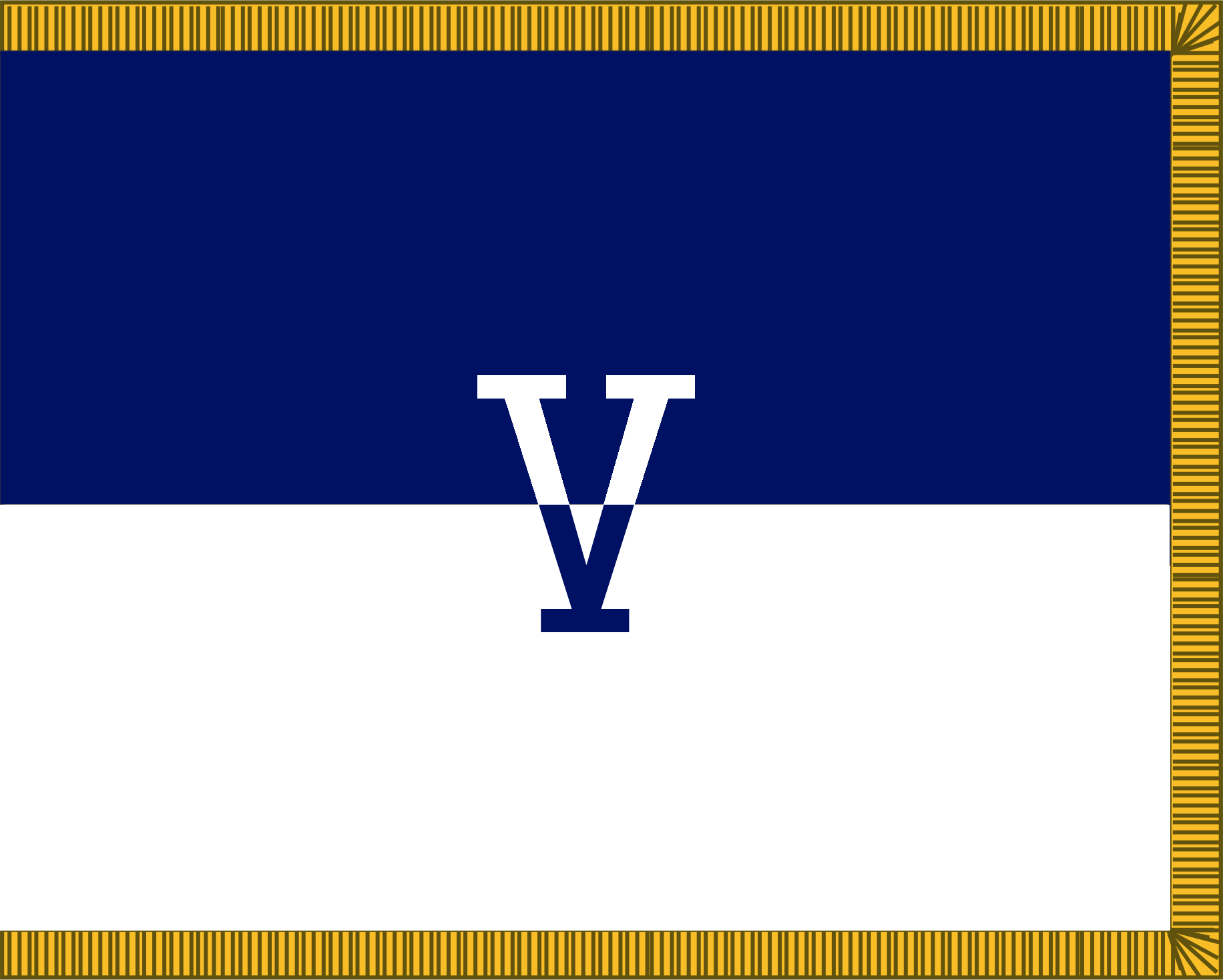
US Army V Corps Huebner Flag

=== V Corps command ===
In January 1945 Huebner took command of the V Corps, which he directed from the Rhine to the Elbe, where his troops made first contact with the Red Army. He commanded V Corps until November 11, 1945.

== Postwar service ==
After World War II, Huebner served as Assistant Army Chief of Staff (G-3) at the Pentagon from late 1945 until 1946 when he became Chief of Staff for the United States European Command (EUCOM). He was promoted to lieutenant general on March 28, 1947, and also served as Deputy Commander in Chief of EUCOM from 1947 to 1950. He was the last Military Governor (acting) of the American Zone in Germany from May 15, 1949, to September 1, 1949.

Huebner retired from the army on November 30, 1950.

== Later years ==
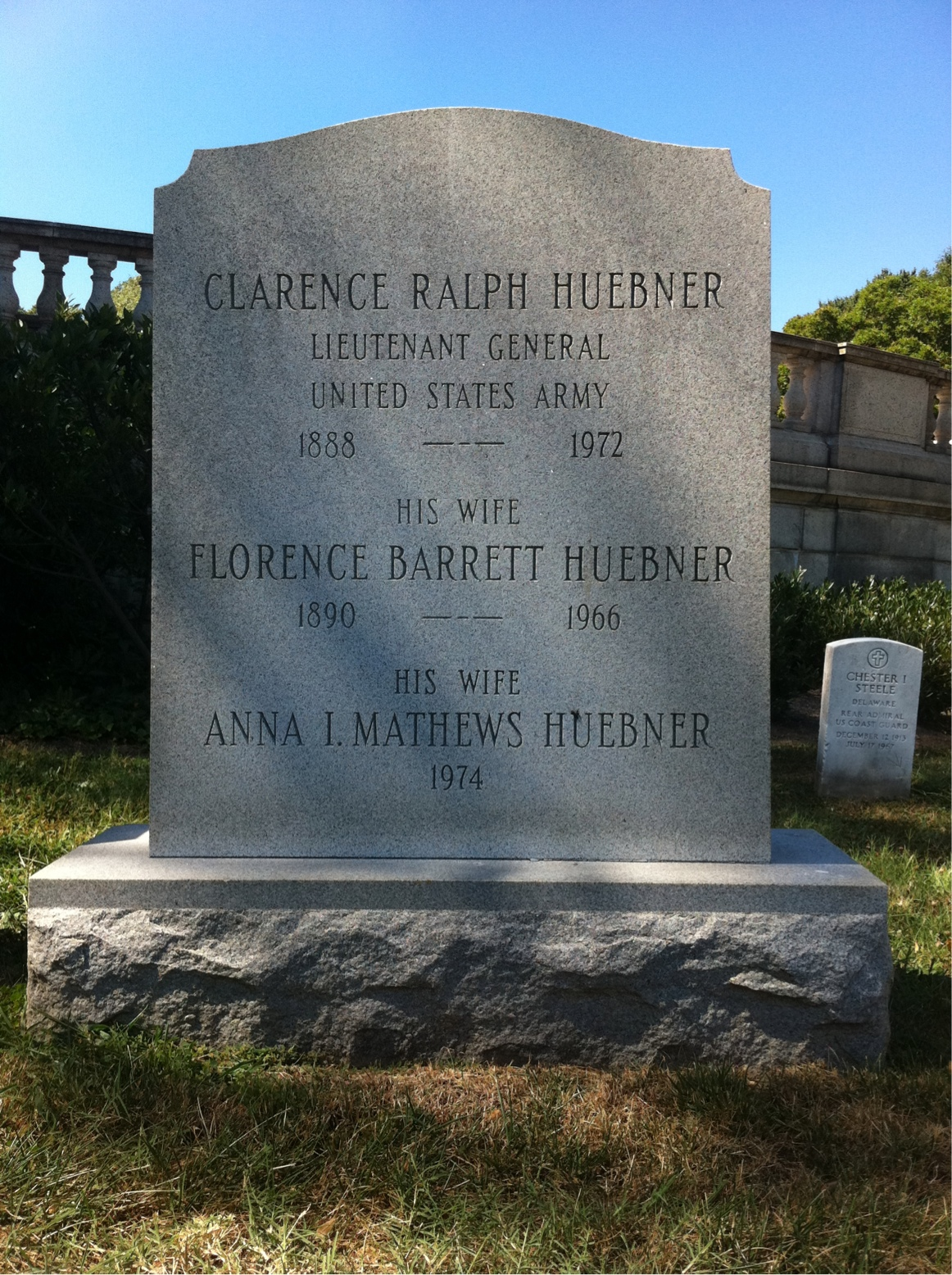
The grave of Lieutenant General Clarence R. Huebner at Arlington National Cemetery.

On September 1, 1951, Huebner became director of New York State's Civil Defense Commission, a post he held until January 1961. A strong advocate of the building of fallout shelters, Huebner believed the United States population would eventually be forced to live full-time in underground shelters and "would see the sunshine only by taking a calculated risk".

Huebner married Florence Barrett in 1921. Following her death in 1966, Huebner married Anna Imelda Mathews in 1968. She died in 1974. All three are buried together in Arlington National Cemetery.

== In popular culture ==
Huebner was portrayed by Charles Macaulay in the 1980 film The Big Red One, in the opening sequence set in World War I and, in the reconstructed extended version, in 1944 just prior to the Battle of Huertgen Forest.

== Decorations ==
Huebner received the following honors and awards during his military career:

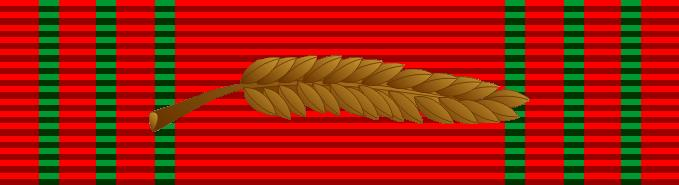

| 1st Row | Distinguished Service Cross with Oak Leaf Cluster | | Army Distinguished Service Medal with two Oak Leaf Clusters | |
| 2nd Row | Silver Star | Legion of Merit | Bronze Star Medal | Purple Heart with Oak Leaf Cluster |
| 3rd Row | Mexican Border Service Medal | World War I Victory Medal with five Battle Clasps | Army of Occupation of Germany Medal | American Defense Service Medal |
| 4th Row | American Campaign Medal | European-African-Middle Eastern Campaign Medal with four service stars | World War II Victory Medal | Army of Occupation Medal |
| 5th Row | National Defense Service Medal | Honorary Companion of the Order of the Bath | Commander of the Legion of Honor (France) | French Croix de guerre 1914–1918 with Palm |
| 6th Row | French Croix de guerre 1939–1945 with Palm | Commander of the Order of Leopold (Belgium) | Belgian Croix de guerre 1940–1945 with Palm | Grand Officer of the Order of the Oak Crown (Luxembourg) |
| 7th Row | War Merit Cross (Italy) | Czechoslovak Order of the White Lion, 2nd Class | Czechoslovak War Cross 1939-1945 | Order of Suvorov Second Class (Union of Soviet Socialist Republics) |

Military offices
| Preceded by Terry Allen Sr. | Commanding General 1st Infantry Division; 1943–1944 | Succeeded by Clift Andrus |
| Preceded by Leonard T. Gerow | Commanding General V Corps; January – November 1945 | Succeeded by Frank W. Milburn |
| Preceded by Lucius D. Clay | Commanding General United States Army Europe; May – September 1949 | Succeeded by Thomas T. Handy |
