= Thurmann (family name) =

Thurmann is a Norwegian surname. Notable people with the surname include:

- Jacob Thurmann Ihlen (1833–1903), Norwegian politician
- Peder Cappelen Thurmann (1839–1919), Norwegian landscape painter
- Wincentz Thurmann Ihlen (1826–1892), Norwegian engineer

== See also ==
- Thurman (disambiguation)
