= Thurmond House (Siloam Springs, Arkansas) =

Historic house in Arkansas, United States

- U.S. National Register of Historic Places
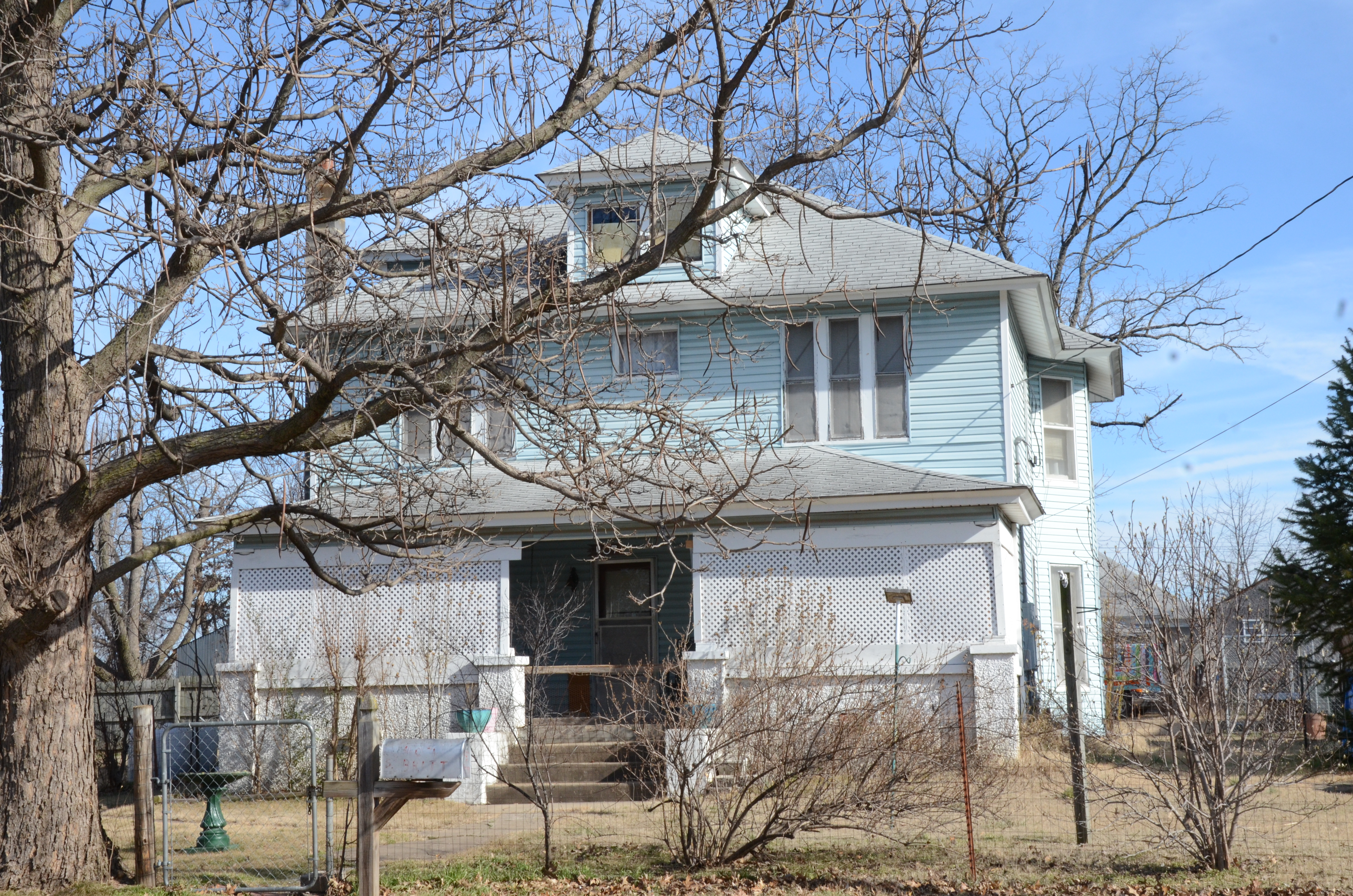

- Location within Arkansas Location within the United States
- Location: 407 Britt, Siloam Springs, Arkansas
- Coordinates: 36°10′57″N 94°32′3″W
- Area: less than one acre
- Built: 1910
- MPS: Benton County MRA
- NRHP reference No.: 87002430
- Added to NRHP: January 28, 1988

The Thurmond House is a historic house at 407 Britt in Siloam Springs, Arkansas. It is an American Foursquare wood-frame house, 2 1/2 stories in height with a wide hip roof. It is finished in novelty siding, with distinctive corner boards topped by capitals. A single-story porch, with a concrete base and piers, extends across the width of the front facade. The second level has a small central window flanked by trios of narrow one-over-one sash; there is a hip-roof dormer in the roof. Built c. 1910, the house is typical of many Foursquare houses built around that time, but is set apart by its porch and corner boards.

The house was listed on the National Register of Historic Places in 1988.

== See also ==
- National Register of Historic Places listings in Benton County, Arkansas
