= Thurmond House =

Thurmond House may refer to:

- Thurmond House (Siloam Springs, Arkansas), listed on the National Register of Historic Places in Benton County, Arkansas
- Thurmond House (Gibsland, Louisiana), listed on the National Register of Historic Places in Louisiana

== See also ==
- Thurmond Historic District, Thurmond, West Virginia
