= Arthur Thurman (footballer) =

English footballer

Personal information
- Full name: Arthur John Thurman
- Date of birth: 8 May 1874
- Place of birth: Nottingham, England
- Date of death: 30 May 1900 (aged 26)
- Place of death: Boshof, South Africa
- Position: Wing half

Senior career*
Years	Team	Apps	(Gls)
1897–1898	Gedling Grove		
1898–1899	Notts County	2	(0)
Total		2	(0)
- * Club domestic league appearances and goals

Arthur John Thurman (8 May 1874 – 30 May 1900) was an English footballer who played in the Football League for Notts County.

== Personal life ==
Thurman was married with two children. He worked as a railway clerk and was a former soldier in the South Nottinghamshire Hussars. In January 1900, he volunteered for service in the Second Boer War and was made a sergeant in the Imperial Yeomanry. On 30 May 1900, he died in Boshof of typhoid fever.
