= Ernestine H. B. Thurman =

American entomologist and researcher

- Born: Ernestine Hogan Basham; March 7, 1920; Atkins, Arkansas, US
- Died: January 22, 1987 (aged 66); Virginia, US
- Resting place: Arlington National Cemetery
- Other name: Ernestine Thurman-Swartzwelder
- Education: University of Maryland
- Known for: mosquitoes; malaria control
- Scientific career
- Workplaces: National Institutes of Health Microbiology Institute

Ernestine Hogan Basham Thurman (March 7, 1920 – January 22, 1987) was an American entomologist and researcher, focusing on mosquitoes and vector control. In 1951 she was the first woman sent by the United States to Thailand to establish a malaria control program.

== Early life and education ==
Thurman was born in Atkins, Arkansas on March 7, 1920. She went to primary and secondary schools in Atkins. She graduated from the University of the Ozarks with a B. S. degree in 1944 while employed as the head of biology at a local secondary school.

In 1958, she was awarded a Ph.D. by the University of Maryland related to her work on mosquitoes in Thailand.

== Career ==
Her interest in mosquitoes start in her first post at the Florida State Department of Health. She was appointed to a post in the Malaria Control in War Areas program, planned from 1940 and active from 1942, to reduce and ideally eradicate malaria in the USA through the use of larvicide and then insecticides against the disease vector, the mosquito. She rose in the organisation to lead the mosquito identification unit of the Bureau of Vector Control in Turlock, California. Thurman was commissioned as a United States Public Health Service officer and became the first woman with the role of Scientist Director.

From 1951 to 1953 she was sent with her husband to Chiang Mai in northern Thailand to start a malaria control program, the first woman sent with this role by the United States. She was assigned the task of malaria-control training advisor. This became a comprehensive program that included disseminating public health information, surveys of mosquitoes, and spraying with DDT as well as training medical and technical officers. It resulted in a reduction in cases of malaria and also acted as a model for later mosquito control efforts.

Thurman returned to the US in 1953 to a post at the National Institutes of Health's Microbiology Institute in Bethesda, Maryland as executive secretary for the Study Section on Tropical Medicine, Division of Research Grants of the United States Public Health Service. She retired from the public health service with the rank of captain.

In 1967, she was appointed as an associate professor in pathology at the Louisiana State University Medical Center with a primary role in research administration. After resigning from this post she was a research fellow at the Center for the Study of Women at Tulane University where she was active in measures to remove barriers to women's advancement in science careers.

== Honors ==
In 1963 she was awarded the National Defense Service Medal for her work in 1954. She received the National Achievement Award of the Phi Delta Gamma in 1984. She received an alumni award from the College of the Ozarks.

== Personal life ==
She met Deed C. Thurman through her work and later married him. He died of malaria and typhoid fever in 1953. They had two children, Deed C. Thurman III and Phyllis L. Thurman. After he died, she moved to Bethesda, Maryland and enrolled in graduate school.

In 1964 she married J. Clyde Swartzwelder and moved to New Orleans, Louisiana. Swatzweider was a professor emeritus at the Louisiana State University. She died of cancer on January 22, 1987 in Virginia. She is buried in Arlington National Cemetery.

== Publications ==
Thurman was the author or co-author of at least 40 publications. These included:

- E. B. Thurman (1962) Asia: a challenge to scientists. AIBS Bull. 12 24–7.
- E. B. Thurman (1959) Robert Evans Snodgrass, insect anatomist and morphologist. Smithson Misc Collect. 137.
- E. Thurman and P. Johnson (1950) The taxonomic characters of the larvae of the genus Culiseta Felt, 1904 in California. Pan-Pac Entomol. 26 179–87.
- E. B. Basham (1948) Culex (Melanoconion) mulrennani, a new species from Florida (Diptera: Culicidae). Ann Entomol Soc Am. 41 1–7.
