= 83rd Field Artillery Regiment =

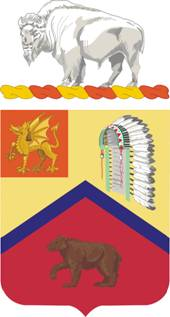
- 83rd Field Artillery Regiment coat of arms
- Active: 1917
- Country: United States
- Branch: Army
- Type: Field artillery
- Motto(s): FLAGRANTE BELLO; During Hostilities

Insignia
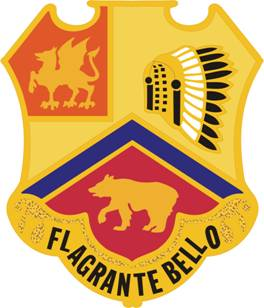
- Distinctive unit insignia

The 83rd Field Artillery Regiment is a regiment of the Field Artillery Branch of the United States Army.

The 1st Battalion, 83rd Artillery was formed in 1966 at Fort Sill, Oklahoma. The battalion departed for Vietnam in October 1966 and remained there until 1971 when the unit was stood down. In Vietnam, the 83rd was originally at Bear Cat, Nui Dat and Xuân Lộc but later moved to many other locations in Vietnam.

The battalion was associated with XXIV Corps and the 54th and 108th Artillery Groups while in Vietnam.

From 1966 to 1969 A Battery, 1st Battalion, 83rd Field Artillery was located at the 1st Australian Task Force base at Nui Dat, Phước Tuy Province and supported Australian and New Zealand operations in the region.

== Lineage ==
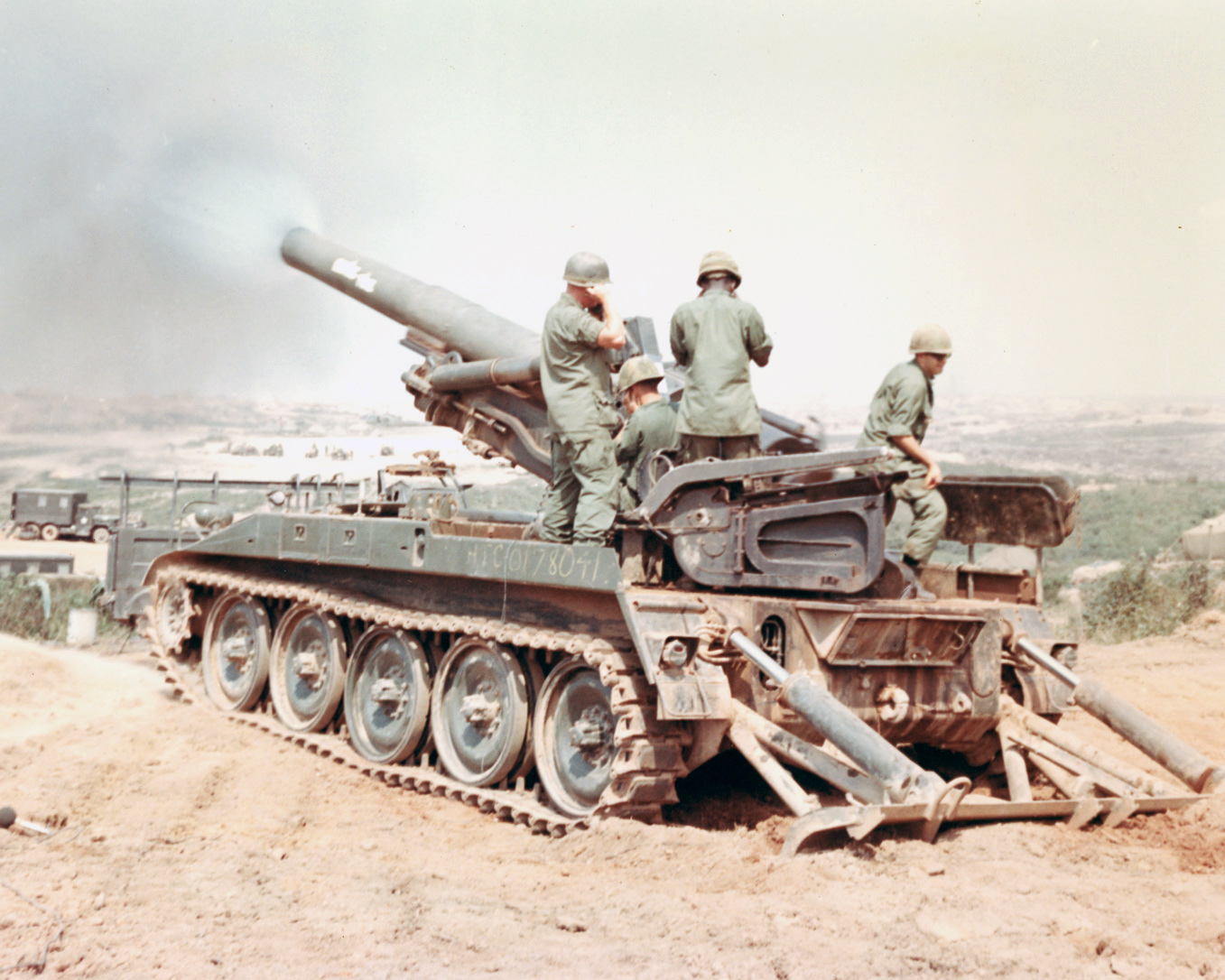
Operation "Jeb Stuart" The gun crew of Btry. "B", 1st Bn, 83rd Arty, fire their weapon in support of other batteries during a fire mission. 17 March 1968.

Constituted 1 July 1916 in the Regular Army as the 25th Cavalry. Organized 5 June 1917 at Fort D.A. Russell (Wyoming). Converted and redesignated 1 November 1917 as the 83rd Field Artillery. Assigned 17 December 1917 to the 8th Infantry Division (United States).

- Relieved 5 September 1919 from assignment to the 8th Division.

Inactivated (less 1st Battalion) 7 January 1922 at Camp Benning, Georgia.

- Disbanded (less 1st Battalion) 28 February 1927 (1st Battalion concurrently reorganized and redesignated as the 83rd Field Artillery Battalion). Regiment (less 1st Battalion)
- reconstituted 17 March 1930 in the Regular Army and assigned to the 8th Division (83rd Field Artillery Battalion concurrently reorganized and redesignated as the 1st Battalion, 83rd Field Artillery).
- Relieved 1 October 1933 from assignment to the 8th Division and assigned to the 4th Infantry Division (United States) (2d Battalion concurrently activated at Fort Bragg, North Carolina).
- Relieved 16 October 1939 from assignment to the 4th Division.
- Assigned 1 June 1940 to the 4th Division and activated (less 1st and 2d Battalions) at Fort Benning, Georgia.
- Relieved 20 July 1940 from assignment to the 4th Division and assigned to the 8th Division.

Reorganized and redesignated 9 January 1941 as the 83rd Field Artillery Battalion. Relieved 1 June 1941 from assignment to the 8th Division.

- Reorganized and redesignated 21 October 1942 as the 83rd Armored Field Artillery Battalion. Assigned 6 July 1945 to the 9th Armored Division (United States). Inactivated 7 October 1945 at Camp Patrick Henry, Virginia.
- Redesignated 1 August 1946 as the 83rd Field Artillery Battalion; concurrently, relieved from assignment to the 9th Armored Division and activated at Fort Benning, Georgia.
- Inactivated 23 November 1948 at Fort Benning, Georgia.
- Activated 11 February 1950 at Fort Bragg, North Carolina.
- Inactivated 1 June 1958 at Fort Bragg, North Carolina.
- Reorganized and redesignated 1 July 1959 as the 83rd Artillery, a parent regiment under the Combat Arms Regimental System. Redesignated 1 September 1971 as the 83rd Field Artillery.

In Vietnam the regiment's campaigns included Counteroffensive, Phase II; Counteroffensive, Phase III; Tet Counteroffensive; Counteroffensive, Phase IV; Counteroffensive, Phase V; Counteroffensive, Phase VI; Tet 69/Counteroffensive Summer–Fall 1969; Winter–Spring 1970; Sanctuary Counteroffensive; Counteroffensive, Phase VII.

== Distinctive unit insignia ==
- Description

A gold color metal and enamel device 1 5/32 inches (2.9 cm) in height overall consisting of the shield and motto of the coat of arms.

- Symbolism

The shield is yellow for Cavalry and red for Artillery. The blue chevronel denotes the Regiment's short period of service overseas during World War I. The Cheyenne warbonnet refers to the birthplace of the organization in Wyoming. The bear, from the crest of the state of California, commemorates service in the 8th Division at Camp Fremont, California. The canton represents the Regiment's formation by transfer of men from the 1st Cavalry (formerly 1st Dragoons) in 1917.

- Background

The distinctive unit insignia was originally approved for the 83d Field Artillery Regiment on 15 November 1923. It was redesignated for the 83d Field Artillery Battalion on 5 October 1942. It was redesignated for the 83d Armored Field Artillery Battalion on 13 May 1943. The insignia was redesignated for the 83d Field Artillery Battalion on 30 June 1950. It was again redesignated for the 83d Artillery Regiment on 21 November 1958. Effective 1 September 1971, the insignia was redesignated for the 83d Field Artillery Regiment. It was amended to reflect the change in symbolism on 10 January 1973. The insignia was amended to correct the symbolism on 12 October 1984.

== Coat of arms ==
=== Blazon ===
- Shield

Party per chevron Or and Gules, a chevronel Azure between in sinister chief a Cheyenne warbonnet and in base a grizzly bear passant both Proper. On a canton Tenné a dragon passant of the first.

- Crest

On a wreath of the colors, Or and Gules, a bison statant Argent. Motto FLAGRANTE BELLO (During Hostilities).

- Symbolism
- Shield

The shield is yellow for Cavalry and red for Artillery. The blue chevronel denotes the Regiment's short period of service overseas during World War I. The Cheyenne warbonnet refers to the birthplace of the organization in Wyoming. The bear, from the crest of the state of California, commemorates service in the 8th Division at Camp Fremont, California. The canton represents the Regiment's formation by transfer of men from the 1st Cavalry (formerly 1st Dragoons) in 1917.

- Crest

The crest also symbolizes the birthplace of the organization.

- Background

The coat of arms was originally approved for the 83d Field Artillery Regiment on 18 March 1920. It was redesignated for the 83d Field Artillery Battalion on 5 October 1942. It was redesignated for the 83d Armored Field Artillery Battalion on 13 May 1943. The insignia was redesignated for the 83d Field Artillery Battalion on 30 June 1950. It was again redesignated for the 83d Artillery Regiment on 21 November 1958. Effective 1 September 1971, the insignia was redesignated for the 83d Field Artillery Regiment. It was amended to reflect the change in symbolism on 10 January 1973. The coat of arms was amended to correct the symbolism on 12 October 1984.
