= Dovie Thurman =

American community activist (1946–1997)

- Born: 1946; Chicago, Illinois
- Died: April 7, 1997 (aged 50–51); Chicago, Illinois
- Other name: Little Dovie Thurman
- Occupation: Community activist

Little Dovie Thurman (1946 – April 7, 1997) was a community activist who dedicated her life to the social and political development of people in poor communities. She is most known for her involvement in the Chicago welfare rights campaign of the 1960s. Thurman worked toward welfare rights and reform with a local organization on the north side of the city called JOIN (Jobs or Income Now), as well as Uptown Voices advocating for quality, affordable housing for low-income people in Uptown, Chicago and its surrounding communities. As President, Thurman worked to empower community members through participation in housing advocacy, development, rehabilitation and management.

== Personal life ==
Dovie Thurman was born in Chicago, Illinois in 1946. She was known as Little Dovie by family and friends after her aunt Dovie Coleman, or Big Dovie. Dovie's father passed when she was only 1 year old, leaving her to be raised by her grandmother. In 1965, after years of living in an all-Black community in St. Louis, Missouri, Thurman and her two children moved back to Chicago where she settled in the Uptown neighborhood. She was 19 years old and married to a man stationed in Vietnam.

== Community activism ==
Thurman began her career as a community activist in 1965. That same year, she met Peggy Terry, a white southern migrant worker who relocated to the neighborhood as a civil rights activist, in a storefront office in Uptown. By 1966, a local organization was gaining popularity among students and residents for its efforts of reducing urban poverty. Jobs or Income Now (JOIN) included noted organizers like Rennie Davis, Richard Rothstein, and Casey Hayden lived in Uptown, undertaking the slow and uneven process of pushing locals towards political action. Early successes included a sit-in at the city welfare office, and tenant strikes that resulted in contracts between collectivized renters and landlords. These efforts antagonized most of the local political and social elites. The chapter was permanently relocated to the Uptown neighborhood, focusing attention on a wider range of pressing, and therefore actionable, community issues: welfare, housing conditions, unemployment and police brutality. As more student organizers began to arrive in Chicago, JOIN also welcomed an influx of community members who became a steady force in the organization. Peggy Terry and Candy Hockenberry came to JOIN around the same time, along with Thurman, her aunt Big Dovie, and Virginia Bowers. The five women became fast friends and, together, they formed the core of JOIN's welfare committee and became the backbone of the organization's housing rights work. Thurman who served as chairperson for the committee recollects her participation with JOIN as her first involvement in the civil rights movement and her first encounter with poor whites. "I had never seen poor white people," says Thurman. After meeting these women she stated, "We found out we had more in common than we ever thought. It's because we began to communicate." Her involvement with JOIN was an eye-opening experience that allowed for the intersection of the two communities to cultivate a movement unprecedented in Uptown.

== Notability ==
Thurman was highly respected in her community, working as an activist for many social issues, she acknowledges one of her greatest gains as the Welfare, "Know Your Rights" campaign in which she traveled to educate people in different communities about the importance of staying informed on the happenings of the system, and how to advocate for yourself within the system. After spending the majority of her life working for civil rights not only in Chicago but also in Alabama and Washington D.C., Thurman decided to document her story of activism in an oral history produced by her old friend Studs Terkel. The interview was featured in a series of oral projects featuring community organizers. Thurman's interview finally shed the emotions and tribulations faced by women like Dovie who humbly fought for years without formal recognition for her work.

== Death ==
Thurman's documentary was produced only a month before her death. Reporting on the announcement the Chicago Tribune's Mary Schmich wrote, "Thurman gave her own heart away, marching and protesting and speechifying on behalf of poor people, never mind that for years the doctors told her to sit still, lie down, stay quiet. Some politicians would have been happier if she'd obeyed."

On April 7, 1997, Dovie Thurman died at the age of 51 from heart failure in Chicago, Illinois. Thurman was survived by her three children, James, Kim, and Lynn.

== Legacy ==
Toby Prinz-Dovie Thurman annual award dinner, Northside Action 4 Justice
