= Karl Borromäus Thumann =

German theologian (1820-1874)

- Born: 13 September 1820; Bamberg, Bavaria
- Died: 15 May 1874; Bamberg, Bavaria, Germany
- Occupations: Theologian; Catholic priest Educator; Vicar General (Bamberg)
- Parent(s): Michael Thumann; Barbara Wöhrler

Karl Borromäus Thumann (13 September 1820 – 15 May 1874) was a German theologian. A succession of promotions within the church culminated with his appointment in 1869 as Vicar general in Bamberg (Bavaria).

== Life ==
Karl Borromäus Thumann was born in Bamberg in 1820, approximately seventeen years after the area had been annexed by Bavaria. On leaving school he attended Bamberg's Ernestine seminary and the Ludwig-Maximilians-Universität München, studying philosophy and Catholic theology. On 2 March 1844, he was ordained into the priesthood, and he received his doctorate in theology in 1845. His first incumbency was as a vicar at Zeuln. Just two years later, however, despite his youth, he was appointed on 14 October 1846 to the post of "regent" of the Ducal Georgianum (seminary), which had been relocated from Landshut to Munich twenty years earlier. On 8 October 1855, he was promoted to the directorship of the Georgianum, at the same time being appointed to a full teaching professorship in pastoral theology, liturgy, homiletics, and catechetics at the Ludwig-Maximilians-Universität München.

He resigned from his work in Munich due to nervous exhaustion and returned to Bamberg, taking a job in the cathedral chapter on 29 May 1863. In 1869, he was appointed Vicar general for the diocese. Thumann died on 15 May 1874, five months short of his fifty-fourth birthday.
