= Maxwell R. Thurman =

United States Army general (1931–1995)

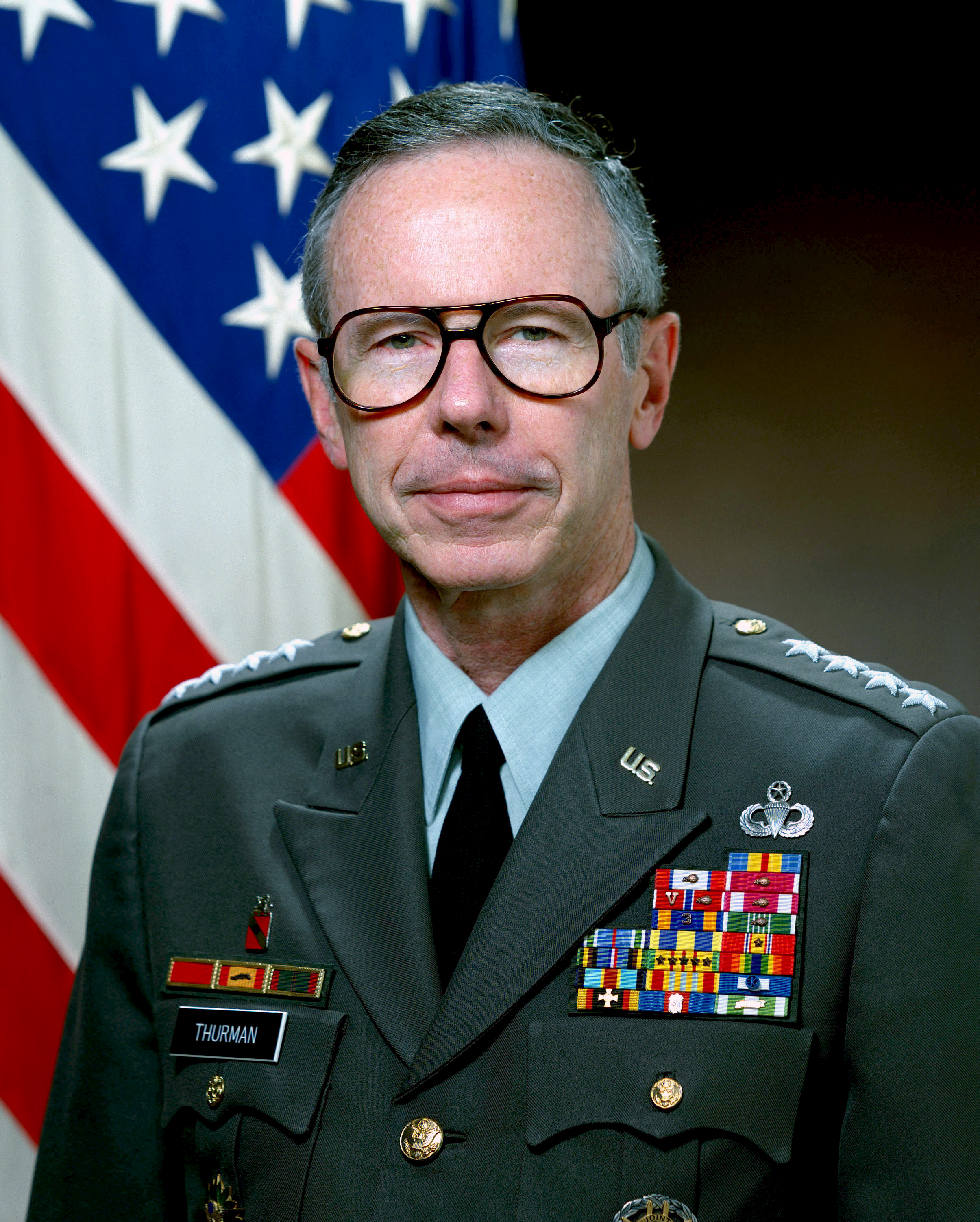
- General Maxwell Reid Thurman
- Born: 18 February 1931; High Point, North Carolina, US
- Died: 1 December 1995 (aged 64); Walter Reed Army Medical Center, Washington, D.C., US
- Burial place: Arlington National Cemetery
- Relatives: Lieutenant General John R. Thurman III (brother)
- Military career
- Allegiance: United States
- Branch: United States Army
- Service years: 1953–1991
- Rank: General
- Nicknames: "Mad Max" "Maxatollah"
- Commands: United States Southern Command; United States Army Training and Doctrine Command; Vice Chief of Staff of the United States Army; United States Army Recruiting Command; 2d Howitzer Battalion, 35th Field Artillery Regiment
- Conflicts: 1958 Lebanon crisis Vietnam War; Invasion of Panama
- Awards: Defense Distinguished Service Medal; Army Distinguished Service Medal (2); Legion of Merit (2); Bronze Star Medal (2)

Maxwell Reid Thurman (18 February 1931 – 1 December 1995) was a United States Army general, who served as Vice Chief of Staff of the United States Army and commander of United States Army Training and Doctrine Command.

== Early life and education ==
Thurman attended North Carolina State University, graduating with a bachelor's degree in chemical engineering (ceramics). While in college he was a member of the Professional Engineering Fraternity Theta Tau.

== Military career ==
Thurman was commissioned a second lieutenant of Ordnance from NCSU's ROTC program in 1953 and branch transferred to Field Artillery. His first assignment was with the 11th Airborne Division, and in 1958 his Honest John Rocket platoon was deployed to Lebanon.

From 1961 to 1963 Thurman served in South Vietnam as an intelligence officer for South Vietnam's I Corps. Following his service in Vietnam, Thurman became one of the few non-Academy graduates ever assigned as a company tactical officer at the United States Military Academy. In 1966 he attended the Command and General Staff College, then returned to South Vietnam in 1967, where he assumed command of the 2d Howitzer Battalion, 35th Field Artillery Regiment in 1968.

=== Later assignments ===
After completing the United States Army War College in 1970, Thurman held numerous troop and staff assignments before assuming command of United States Army Recruiting Command in 1979, where he initiated the highly successful "BE ALL YOU CAN BE" recruiting campaign. From 1981 to 1983 he was Deputy Chief of Staff of the Army, Personnel (DCSPER) and from 1983 to 1987 he was the Vice Chief of Staff of the United States Army.

In 1989 Thurman applied for retirement while serving as Commanding General, United States Army Training and Doctrine Command. Instead, he was handpicked by President George H. W. Bush to be Commander-in-Chief, United States Southern Command (USSOUTHCOM). In this position, he planned and executed Operation Just Cause, the 1989 invasion of Panama.

== Later life and death ==
Thurman was diagnosed with acute myelogenous leukemia while still commander in chief of USSOUTHCOM, shortly after Operation Just Cause. He retired in 1991 after more than thirty-seven years of service, and died in 1995 at Walter Reed Army Medical Center in Washington, aged 64. A funeral service was held on December 7, 1995, at the Fort Myer, Virginia, chapel, followed by interment at Arlington National Cemetery (Section 30, Grave 416-A-LH).

Thurman, a lifelong bachelor, was survived by his brother, the late army Lieutenant General John R. Thurman III.

== Honors ==
Thurman's awards and decorations include the Defense Distinguished Service Medal, the Army Distinguished Service Medal, the Legion of Merit and the Bronze Star Medal with "V" device. In August 2010 Thurman was posthumously inducted into the Theta Tau Alumni Hall of Fame for outstanding contribution to his profession.

== Legacy ==
An award is given every year by the United States Army Medical Research and Materiel Command (MRMC) in honor of General Thurman. The award is generally presented at the annual meeting of the American Telemedicine Association.

== Awards and decorations ==
- Master Parachutist Badge
- Joint Chiefs of Staff Identification Badge
- Army Staff Identification Badge

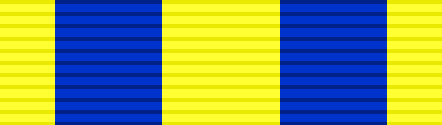
Defense Distinguished Service Medal
Army Distinguished Service Medal with one bronze oak leaf cluster
Legion of Merit with oak leaf cluster
Bronze Star Medal with "V" Device and Oak Leaf Cluster
Meritorious Service Medal with oak leaf cluster
Air Medal (3 awards)
Army Commendation Medal with oak leaf cluster
Joint Service Achievement Medal
Meritorious Unit Commendation
Selective Service System Distinguished Service Medal
National Defense Service Medal with two Service stars
Armed Forces Expeditionary Medal
Vietnam Service Medal with five Service stars
Army Service Ribbon
Army Overseas Service Ribbon
Vietnam Armed Forces Honor Medal 1st class
National Order of Merit (France) (Commander)
Badge of Honour of the Bundeswehr in gold (Germany)
Carabobo Star (Venezuela)
Vietnam Gallantry Cross Unit Citation
Civil Actions Medal Unit Citation (Vietnam)
Vietnam Campaign Medal

Military offices
Preceded by John A. Wickham Jr.	Vice Chief of Staff of the United States Army; 1983–1987	Succeeded by Arthur E. Brown Jr.
Preceded by Carl E. Vuono	Commanding General, United States Army Training and Doctrine Command; 1987–1989	Succeeded by John W. Foss
Preceded by Frederick Woerner	United States Southern Command; 1989–1990	Succeeded by George A. Joulwan
