= Roy Thurman =

American Army general (1924–2004)

John Royster Thurman III
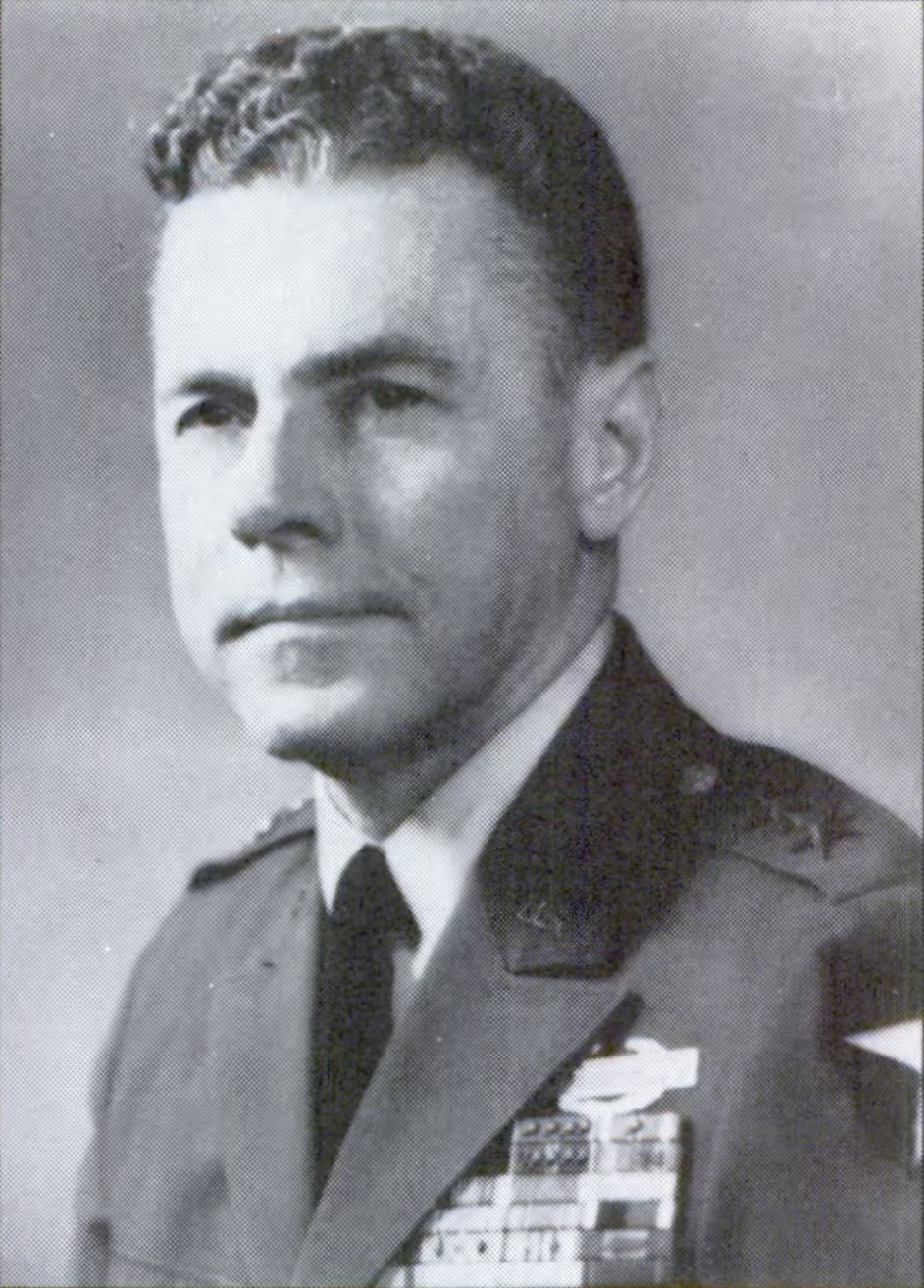
- Born: April 11, 1924; Lexington, Kentucky
- Died: May 29, 2004 (aged 80); Walter Reed Army Medical Center
- Burial place: Arlington National Cemetery
- Relatives: General Maxwell R. Thurman (brother)
- Military career
- Allegiance: United States
- Branch: United States Army
- Service years: 1942–1943, 1946–1979
- Rank: Lieutenant General
- Nickname: Roy
- Commands: United States Army Command and General Staff College (1976–77); 2nd Infantry Division (1975–76); 25th Infantry Division Artillery; 1st Battalion, 8th Field Artillery Regiment
- Conflicts: World War II; Korean War; Vietnam War
- Awards: Army Distinguished Service Medal; Legion of Merit (6); Distinguished Flying Cross (2); Bronze Star Medal (5); Purple Heart; Air Medal (35)

John Royster "Roy" Thurman III (April 11, 1924 – May 29, 2004) was a United States Army lieutenant general.

== Early life and education ==
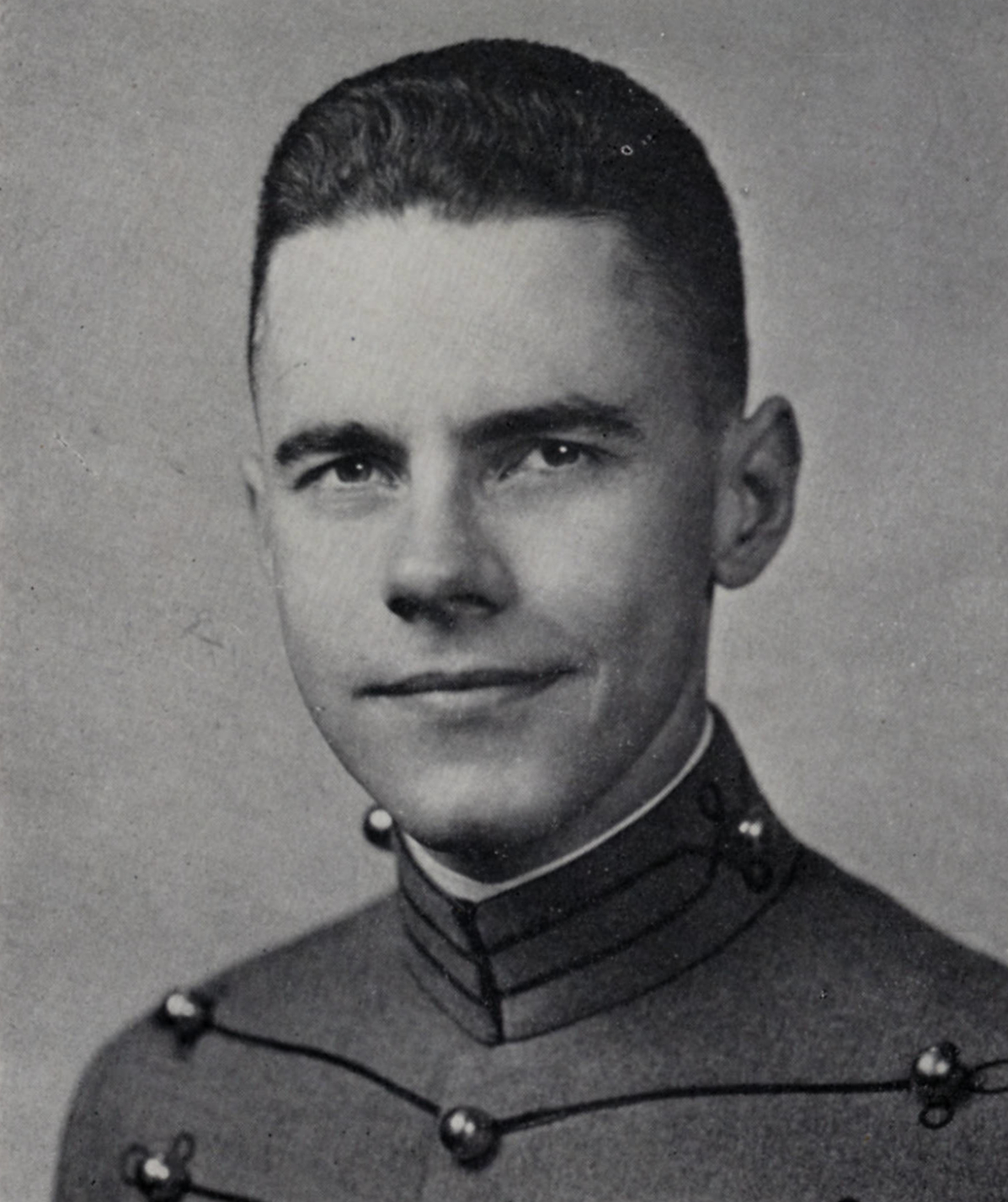
Thurman as a West Point cadet c. 1946

Thurman was born in Lexington, Kentucky in 1924 but moved to High Point, North Carolina in 1928. He graduated from High Point Central High School in 1941 and then enrolled at North Carolina State College. After the outbreak of World War II, Thurman enlisted in the United States Army Air Forces in 1942. Appointed to the United States Military Academy, he graduated in June 1946. He was also a graduate of the Command and General Staff College (1956), the Armed Forces Staff College (1961), the Naval War College (1965), and Harvard University's six-week Advanced Management Program (1969). George Washington University awarded Thurman a Master of Science in international affairs. His 1965 thesis was entitled Technology in the Congo - - a progress report.

== Military career ==
Before attending West Point, Thurman served as an enlisted man in the United States Army from November 1942 to July 1943.

Thurman held commands during both the Korean War and the Vietnam War. In Korea, he was a battery commander for the 57th Field Artillery Battalion, 7th Infantry Division and the 674th Airborne Field Artillery Battalion, 187th Airborne Regimental Combat Team. In Vietnam from August 1965 to March 1968, Thurman commanded the 1st Battalion, 8th Field Artillery Regiment and the 25th Infantry Division Artillery. He was promoted to colonel on December 5, 1967.

After a tour at the Pentagon, Thurman returned Vietnam in January 1970. He became assistant commander of the 25th Infantry Division in April 1970 and was promoted to brigadier general on June 1, 1970. Transferred to West Germany in March 1971, Thurman served as assistant commander of the 8th Infantry Division.

Thurman was promoted to major general on March 1, 1973. He served as commander of the 2nd Infantry Division in South Korea from May 1975 to June 1976. Thurman then became commandant of the Combined Arms Center, Command and General Staff College and Fort Leavenworth, Kansas. He was promoted to lieutenant general on September 1, 1977.

Thurman last served as Deputy Commanding General, Army Training and Doctrine before retiring on October 1, 1979, after 33 years of service. After retirement, he lived in Arlington County, Virginia. Thurman died from pancreatic cancer on May 29, 2004, at the Walter Reed Medical Center in Washington, D.C.

Roy Thurman was the older brother of General Maxwell Reid Thurman. Thurman's remains are interred at Arlington National Cemetery.

== Awards ==
Thurman's military awards and honors include the Army Distinguished Service Medal, the Legion of Merit with five Oak Leaf Clusters, the Distinguished Flying Cross with one Oak leaf Cluster, a Bronze Star Medal with Valor Device and four Oak Leaf Clusters, the Air Medal with 34 oak leaf clusters, the Army Commendation Medal, the Purple Heart, the Combat Infantryman Badge, and a Master Parachutist Badge.
