= 25th Infantry Division Artillery (United States) =

25th DIVARTY (Division Artillery)
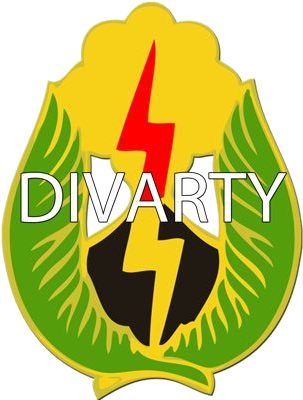
- 25th DIVARTY distinctive unit insignia
- Active: 1941–2005; 2014–present
- Country: United States of America
- Branch: United States Army
- Type: Field artillery
- Role: Division force fires HQ
- Size: Brigade
- Part of: 25th Infantry Division
- Garrison/HQ: Schofield Barracks, HI
- Motto: "Tropic Thunder"
- Engagements: World War II; Korean War; Vietnam War; Operation Enduring Freedom, Afghanistan
- Decorations: Meritorious Unit Commendation; Philippine Presidential Unit Citation; Republic of Korea Presidential Unit Citation; Republic of Vietnam Cross of Gallantry with Palm
- Website: 25th DIVARTY

Commanders
- Commander: COL Bryan D. Schott
- Command Sergeant Major: CSM Paul I. Fluharty

The 25th Infantry Division Artillery (often abbreviated DIVARTY) is the divisional artillery component of the 25th Infantry Division (United States).

== History ==
The 25th Division Artillery was activated 1 October 1941 on Schofield Barracks, HI. 25th DIVARTY initially consisted of 3 direct support battalions from the 8th Field Artillery Regiment (8th, 64th, and 89th battalions), the 90th General Support Battalion. The 25th DIVARTY first entered combat two months after activation on 7 December 1941, when the Imperial Forces of Japan conducted a surprise attack on US military installations on Oahu, HI. 25th DIVARTY continued on active status during World War II, Korean War, Vietnam War and the Global War on Terror before deactivation in 2005. It reactivated 1 October 2014 on Schofield Barracks, HI.

=== World War II ===
After the United States declared war, the 25th DIVARTY spent the next year training and preparing for their support of 25th Infantry Division in the Pacific Theater of war. First arriving to Guadalcanal in late 1942, 25th DIVARTY supported combat operation beginning in January 1943, participating in the seizure of Kokumbona and the reduction of the Mount Austen Pocket in some of the bitterest fighting of the Pacific campaign.

25th DIVARTY conducted sustained combat operations in the Philippines for over 160 days during the Luzon Campaign. Most notably, 25th DIVARTY planned and executed fires support that aided in 25th Infantry Division's ability to take Highway 5 and Battle of Balete Pass, which was defended by the 2nd Tank Division (Imperial Japanese Army). Throughout the 160 days of sustained combat in the Philippines, the 90th FA BN fired over 42,000 rounds in support of the 25th Infantry Division.

After the end of hostilities between the Empire of Japan and the United States, 25th DIVARTY joined the remainder of the division on Japan during the post-war occupation. Elements of 25th DIVARTY first arrived in Japan in May 1946.

=== Korean War ===
During the Korean War, the 25th Infantry Division was ordered to defend the final US/South Korean stronghold of Pusan against North Korean attack. In July 1950, the 25th DIVARTY landed in South Korea with the 8th, 64th, 90th, and the 159th Field Artillery Battalions. 25th DIVARTY fires supported the first offensive actions by the division with the capture of the Yechon Road Junction on 20 July 1950. 25th DIVARTY participated in all ten of 25th Infantry Division's campaigns.

=== Vietnam War ===
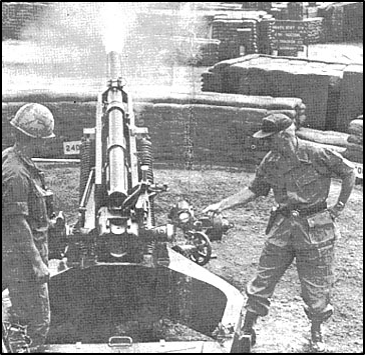
Major General Ellis W. Williamson pulls the lanyard to fire the 900,000th round used by the 1st Battalion, 8th Artillery since the unit came to Vietnam in January 1966. The round was fired from Fire Support Base Pershing.

25th DIVARTY entered the Vietnam War in support of 25th Infantry Division, 1st Marine Division, and Republic of Vietnam forces to provide fire support to these units, additionally 25th DIVARTY was instrumental in combatting communist forces in the Southeast Asia region.

=== Global War on Terror ===
25th DIVARTY deployed to Afghanistan in June 2004 for a 12-month tour of duty. While there, it was given the mission of operating as a maneuver brigade task force known as Combined Task Force Thunder. 25th DIVARTY was designated Regional Command East, which comprised 16 provinces in eastern Afghanistan along the Pakistan border. TF Thunder also prevented insurgent attempts to disrupt the Afghan presidential elections in October 2004.

=== Today ===
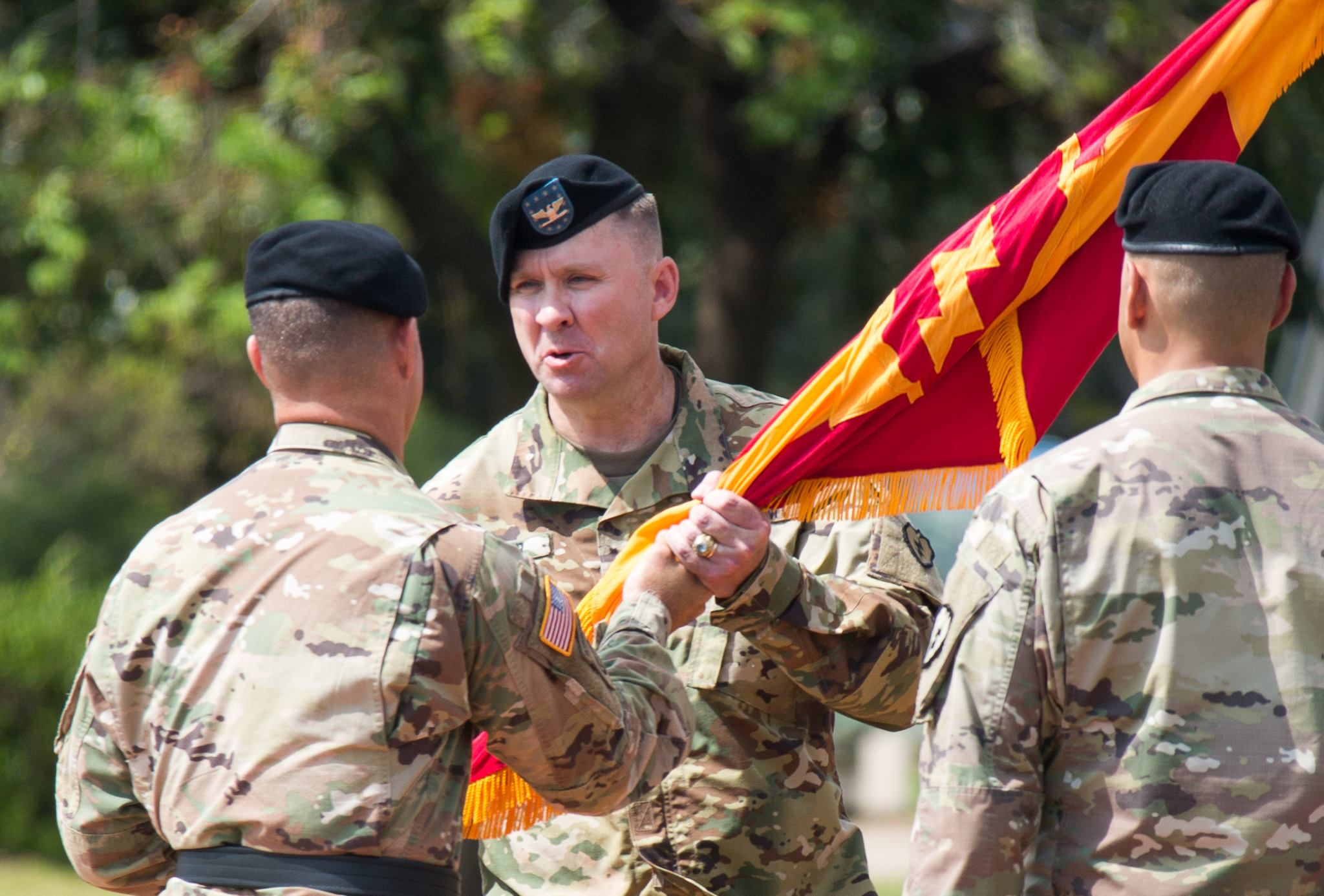
Col. Matthew N. Stader receives command of 25th DIVARTY during a change of command ceremony on 20 July 2016

On 1 October 2014 Headquarters and Headquarters Battery, 25th DIVARTY reactivated at Schofield Barracks, HI under the command of COL Christopher Cardoni. The mission of HHB is to provide a focal point for ensuring that the 25th Infantry Division field artillery battalions receive uniformed training and readiness direction in artillery core competencies. 3-7 FA BN and 2-11 FA BN are currently attached to 25th DIVARTY.

In 2016, Col. Christopher J. Cardoni relinquished command to Col. Matthew N. Stader.

Colonel Katz is the current commander of 25th ID DIVARTY in 2022

== Lineage and honors ==
=== Lineage ===
- Constituted 26 August 1941 in the Army of the United States as Headquarters and Headquarters Battery, 25th Division Artillery
- Activated 1 October 1941 in Hawaii
- Allotted 27 June 1949 to the Regular Army
- Redesignated 1 February 1957 as Headquarters and Headquarters Battery, 25th Infantry Division Artillery
- Inactivated 15 November 2005 in Hawaii
- Activated 1 October 2014 in Hawaii

=== Campaign participation credit ===
- World War II: Central Pacific; Guadalcanal; Northern Solomons; Luzon
- Korean War: UN Defensive; UN Offensive; CCF Intervention; First UN Counteroffensive; CCF Spring Offensive; UN Summer-Fall Offensive; Second Korean Winter; Korea, Summer-Fall; 1952 Third Korean Winter; Korea, Summer 1953
- Vietnam: Counteroffensive; Counteroffensive, Phase II; Counteroffensive, Phase III; Tet Counteroffensive; Counteroffensive, Phase IV; Counteroffensive, Phase V; Counteroffensive, Phase VI; Tet 69/Counteroffensive; Summer-Fall 1969; Winter-Spring 1970; Sanctuary Counteroffensive; Counteroffensive, Phase VII
- War on Terrorism:
  - Afghanistan: Consolidation I

=== Decorations ===
- Meritorious Unit Commendation (Army), Streamer embroidered VIETNAM 1969
- Meritorious Unit Commendation (Army), Streamer embroidered AFGHANISTAN 2004–2005
- Philippine Presidential Unit Citation, Streamer embroidered 17 OCTOBER 1944 TO 4 JULY 1945
- Republic of Korea Presidential Unit Citation, Streamer embroidered MASAN-CHINJU
- Republic of Korea Presidential Unit Citation, Streamer embroidered MUNSAN-NI
- Republic of Vietnam Cross of Gallantry with Palm, Streamer embroidered VIETNAM 1966–1968
- Republic of Vietnam Cross of Gallantry with Palm, Streamer embroidered VIETNAM 1968–1970
- Republic of Vietnam Civil Action Honor Medal, First Class, Streamer embroidered VIETNAM 1966–1970
