= William E. Thurman =

United States Air Force general (1931–2024)

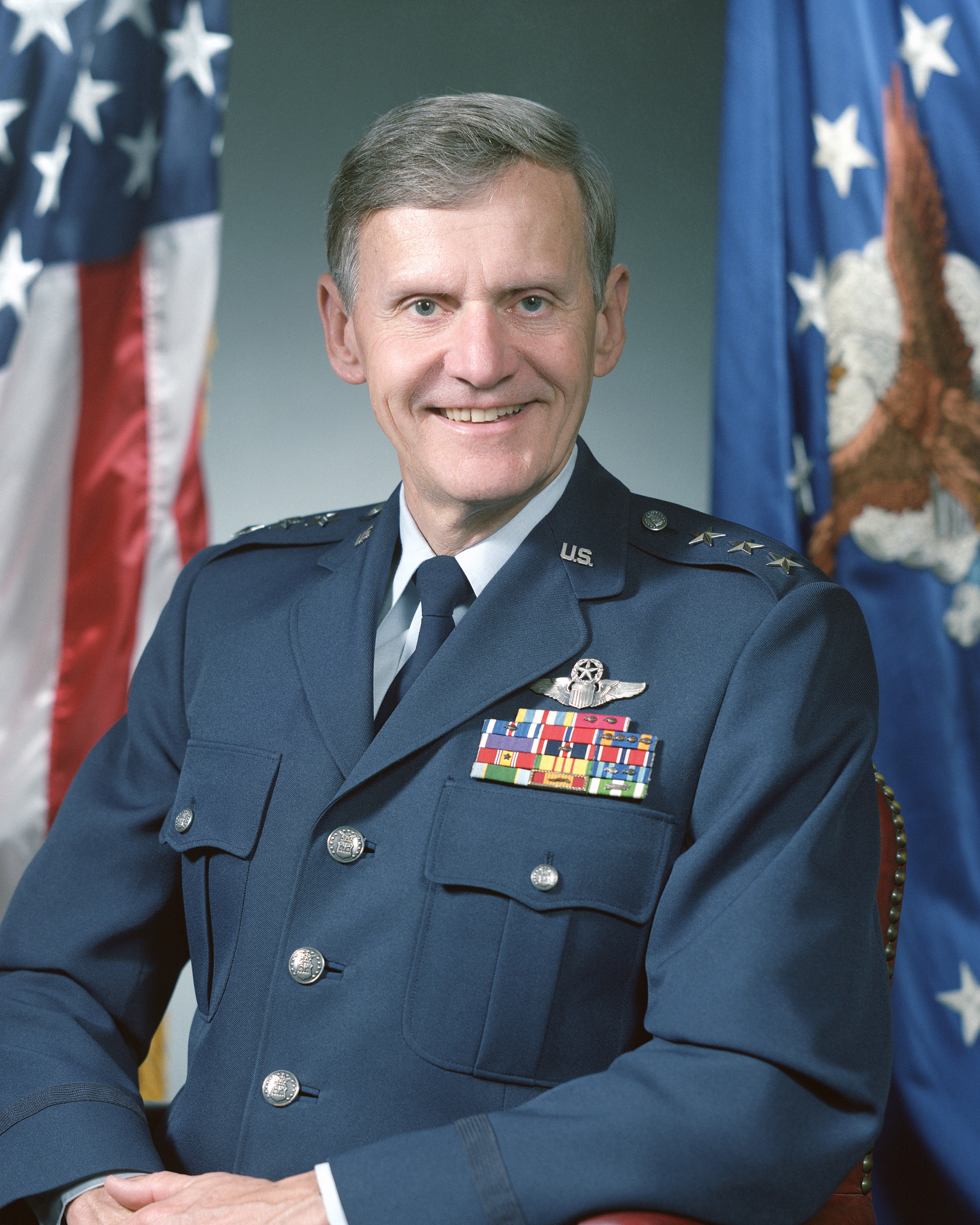
- Born: May 17, 1931; Hodgenville, Kentucky, U.S.
- Died: December 26, 2024 (aged 93)
- Military career
- Allegiance: United States of America
- Branch: United States Air Force
- Service years: 1954–1988
- Rank: Lieutenant General
- Awards: Air Force Distinguished Service Medal; Defense Superior Service Medal; Legion of Merit; Bronze Star Medal; Purple Heart; Air Medal

Lieutenant General William Earl Thurman (May 17, 1931 – December 26, 2024) was a United States Air Force Lieutenant General who was commander, Aeronautical Systems Division, Air Force Systems Command, Wright-Patterson Air Force Base, Ohio.

== Early life ==
Thurman was born in 1931 in Hodgenville, Kentucky. He attended secondary school in central Kentucky and graduated from Danville High School. He earned a Bachelor of Science degree from the United States Naval Academy in 1954, a Master of Science degree in aeronautical engineering from the Air Force Institute of Technology at Wright-Patterson Air Force Base in 1962 and a master of administration degree in management engineering from The George Washington University in 1971. Thurman completed Squadron Officer School in 1959, Army Command and General Staff College in 1965, Industrial College of the Armed Forces in 1975 and the Stanford University executive program in 1977. He also attended the University of Kentucky and Ohio State University.

== Military career ==
After graduating from the United States Naval Academy, Thurman was commissioned as a second lieutenant and entered active duty in June 1954. He was trained as a pilot at Spence Air Base, Georgia and Laredo Air Force Base, Texas. He also received fighter gunnery training at Laughlin Air Force Base, Texas, and Luke Air Force Base, Arizona. He served as an RF-84 pilot at Kadena Air Base, Okinawa, Japan from August 1956 to May 1958.

He completed 2 months of instructor training at Craig Air Force Base, Alabama in July 1958 and then was assigned to the 3576th Pilot Training Squadron at Vance Air Force Base, Oklahoma. In February 1961 he entered the Air Force Institute of Technology at Wright-Patterson Air Force Base. Upon graduation in October 1962 with a M.S. in Aeronautical Engineering, he was assigned as an aeronautical engineer in the Aerospace Research Laboratories, also at Wright-Patterson. General Thurman graduated from the Army Command and General Staff College in July 1965 and transferred to Ent Air Force Base, Colorado, as a staff officer at Air Defense Command headquarters.

Thurman served in Southeast Asia from November 1966 to October 1967, initially as an F-105 fighter pilot and flight commander with the 469th Tactical Fighter Group at Korat Royal Thai Air Force Base, Thailand. He became an operations staff officer at 7th Air Force headquarters, Tan Son Nhut Air Base, Republic of Vietnam.

After returning to the United States in 1967, Thurman was assigned to Headquarters U.S. Air Force, Washington, D.C., where he worked until August 1971. He was first assigned as a foreign development officer in the Office of the Deputy Chief of Staff for Research and Development. In October 1969 he was named aerospace assistant to the National Aeronautics and Space Council, Executive Office of the President.

He was assigned to the Aeronautical Systems Division, Wright-Patterson Air Force Base, in August 1971 as assistant director and a charter member of the Prototype Program Office. He was named deputy for prototypes in June 1973, deputy for air combat fighter in May 1974, deputy for F-16 in January 1975 and deputy for engineering in May 1976.

In May 1978 General Thurman was assigned to the Electronic Systems Division at Hanscom Air Force Base, Massachusetts, as deputy for control and communications systems. He then was named commandant of the Defense Systems Management College at Fort Belvoir, Virginia, in November 1979.

After the B-1 program was reinstituted, General Thurman became Aeronautical Systems Division's deputy for the B-1B in November 1981, again at Wright-Patterson Air Force Base. In May 1985 he moved to Andrews Air Force Base, Md., as vice commander of Air Force Systems Command. He assumed command of the Aeronautical Systems Division, Air Force Systems Command, Wright-Patterson Air Force Base, Ohio in July 1986.

General Thurman was a command pilot with more than 3,800 flying hours and 56 combat missions. His military decorations and awards include the Air Force Distinguished Service Medal, Defense Superior Service Medal, Legion of Merit with two oak leaf clusters, Distinguished Flying Cross with oak leaf cluster, Bronze Star Medal, Purple Heart, Air Medal with four oak leaf clusters and Air Force Outstanding Unit Award with oak leaf cluster. He received the Air Force Association's Meritorious Award for Program Management in 1976 and Distinguished Award for Management in 1985.

He was promoted to Lieutenant General June 1, 1985, with same date of rank. He retired August 1, 1988.

== Personal life ==
Thurman was inducted into the Aviation Museum of Kentucky's Kentucky Aviation Hall of Fame in 2002. In his brief biography on the Hall of Fame's website, Thurman was described as "A command pilot with over 4,000 hours, he has flown nearly every aircraft in the current Air Force inventory."

Thurman was married to Joan (née Hellmann), and resided in Pinehurst, North Carolina until his death on December 26, 2024, at the age of 93
