= Thurman (disambiguation) =

Thurman is a surname and a given name. It may also refer to:

== Places in the United States ==
- Thurman, Colorado, an unincorporated hamlet
- Thurman, Iowa, a city
- Thurman, Kansas, a ghost town
- Thurman, New York, a town
- Thurman, a common name for Centerville, Gallia County, Ohio, a village

== Other uses ==
- Thurman Cafe, Columbus, Ohio
