= 97.9 FM =

FM radio frequency

The following radio stations broadcast on FM frequency 97.9 MHz:

== Argentina ==
- Activa in Adolfo Gonzales Chaves, Buenos Aires
- ADN in Rafaela, Santa Fe
- Altos in Bahía Blanca, Buenos Aires
- Cultura in Buenos Aires
- Destino in J. Gorina, Buenos Aires
- Fenix in Formosa
- La Costa in Necochea, Buenos Aires
- La 100 Neuquén in Neuquén
- LRS313 Génesis in San Jerónimo Norte, Santa Fe
- Open Radio in Buena Esperanza, San Luis
- Radio María in Santo Tomé, Corrientes
- Tartago in Tartagal, Salta
- Universidad in Villa Mercedes, San Luis
- Vida in Rosario, Santa Fe
- Villa Trinidad in Villa Trinidad, Santa Fe
- Mitre Córdoba in Córdoba

== Australia ==
- 2LVR in Parkes, New South Wales
- 979fm in Melton, Victoria
- ABC Classic in Grafton, New South Wales
- ABC Classic in Alice Springs, Northern Territory
- ABC Classic in Mackay, Queensland
- Hit97.9 Kalgoorlie in Kalgoorlie, Western Australia
- 3SEA in Latrobe Valley, Victoria
- 3RMR in Mildura, Victoria

== Canada (Channel 250) ==
- CBAA-FM in Allardville, New Brunswick
- CBCD-FM-1 in Deep River, Ontario
- CBON-FM-11 in Dubreuilville, Ontario
- CBRC-FM in Harvie Heights, Alberta
- CBRJ-FM in Phoenix, British Columbia
- CBWV-FM in Brandon, Manitoba
- CFDL-FM in Deer Lake, Newfoundland and Labrador
- CFLC-FM in Churchill Falls, Newfoundland and Labrador
- CFLN-FM in Goose Bay, Newfoundland and Labrador
- CFNN-FM in St. Anthony, Newfoundland and Labrador
- CFPS-FM in Port Elgin, Ontario
- CHSR-FM in Fredericton, New Brunswick
- CILM-FM in Truro, Nova Scotia
- CINY-FM in Inukjuak, Quebec
- CIRL-FM in Southend, Saskatchewan
- CJCQ-FM in North Battleford, Saskatchewan
- CJLL-FM in Ottawa, Ontario
- CJNC-FM in Norway House, Manitoba
- CJRG-FM-3 in Riviere-au-Renard, Quebec
- CKCJ-FM in Lebel-sur-Quévillon, Quebec
- CKWB-FM in Westlock, Alberta
- CKYX-FM in Fort McMurray, Alberta
- VF2099 in Fort St. James, British Columbia
- VF2142 in Uranium City, Saskatchewan
- VF2410 in Rankin Inlet, Nunavut
- VF2492 in Campement Eastmain, Quebec

== China ==
- CNR The Voice of China in Yingkou
- CNR Business Radio in Hagnzhou

== Indonesia ==
- FeMale Radio in Jakarta

== Malaysia ==
- Raaga in Ipoh, Kampar, Tanjung Tualang, Teluk Intan, Sitiawan, Manjung, Langkap, Manong, Lahat, Menglembu, Pusing, Teronoh, Batu Gajah, Simpang Pulai, Parit, Beruas, Pantai Remis, Chenderong Balai, Lumut, Pulau Pangkor, Chemor, Tanjung Rambutan, Bota, Hutan Melintang, Bagan Datuk, Selekoh, Seri Iskandar, Changkat Keruing, Ayer Tawar, Ulu Bertam, Jeram (Perak), Malim Nawar, Sauk and Lenggong, Perak

== Mexico ==
- XETIA-FM in Guadalajara, Jalisco
- XHEBC-FM in Ensenada, Baja California
- XHEON-FM in Torreón, Coahuila
- XHMJ-FM in Piedras Negras, Coahuila
- XHMMS-FM in Mazatlán, Sinaloa
- XHMX-FM in Tapachula, Chiapas
- XHPXA-FM in San Miguel Xaltepec, Puebla
- XHQTO-FM in Querétaro, Querétaro
- XHSCGL-FM in Jalapa, Tabasco
- XHTRES-FM in Tres Valles, Veracruz
- XHUHV-FM in Chicontepec, Veracruz
- XHZH-FM in Zacatecas, Zacatecas

== Philippines ==
- DWQZ in Pasig
- DWSN in Laoag
- DWMR in Legazpi City
- DYBU-FM in Cebu City
- DXSS-FM in Davao City
- DXCM-FM in Zamboanga City
- DXCF in Tampakan, South Cotabato

== United Kingdom ==
- BBC Radio 1 in Angus, East Ayrshire, Isle of Lewis, Millburn Muir, Shetland, Snowdonia, South Newry, Trowbridge, Ullapool, W. Midlands, Wensleydale, Windermere

== United States (Channel 250) ==
- KARW in Salinas, California
- KBFB in Dallas, Texas
- KBNX in Bangs, Texas
- KBOG-LP in Bandon, Oregon
- KBXB in Sikeston, Missouri
- KBXX in Houston, Texas
- KBZN in Ogden, Utah
- KCJV-LP in Leon Springs, Texas
- KCMR in Mason City, Iowa
- KDXT in Lolo, Montana
- KEFE-LP in Lakeville, Minnesota
- KFBD-FM in Waynesville, Missouri
- KFCC-LP in Mission, Texas
- KFNW in Fargo, North Dakota
- KGNC in Amarillo, Texas
- KICK in Palmyra, Missouri
- KISZ in Cortez, Colorado
- KJMZ in Cache, Oklahoma
- KKBG in Hilo, Hawaii
- KKTT-LP in Winnemucca, Nevada
- KLAX in East Los Angeles, California
- KLLG-LP in Willits, California
- KLMG in Esparto, California
- KLUK in Needles, California
- KLVP in Aloha, Oregon
- KMAI-LP in Alturas, California
- KMGV in Fresno, California
- KNSL in Lamoni, Iowa
- KODM in Odessa, Texas
- KPOD in Crescent City, California
- KPXP in Garapan-Saipan, Northern Mariana Islands
- KQFC in Boise, Idaho
- KQLK in De Ridder, Louisiana
- KQSA in Batesville, Texas
- KRBB in Wichita, Kansas
- KSEZ in Sioux City, Iowa
- KTAG in Cody, Wyoming
- KTLO-FM in Mountain Home, Arkansas
- KTMN in Cloudcroft, New Mexico
- KUPD in Tempe, Arizona
- KVPC in Rapid City, South Dakota
- KVVR in Dutton, Montana
- KWGB in Colby, Kansas
- KXAF in George West, Texas
- KXBG in Cheyenne, Wyoming
- KXDG in Webb City, Missouri
- KYYR-LP in Yakima, Washington
- KZBB in Poteau, Oklahoma
- KZTB in Milton-Freewater, Oregon
- KZWB in Green River, Wyoming
- WALW-LP in Moulton, Alabama
- WBBE in Heyworth, Illinois
- WBEY in Crisfield, Maryland
- WBSX in Hazleton, Pennsylvania
- WBYJ-LP in Burlington, North Carolina
- WCCV-LP in Williamsburg, Massachusetts
- WCKL in Chicago, Illinois
- WCPR in Wiggins, Mississippi
- WDMG in Ambrose, Georgia
- WEVE in Eveleth, Minnesota
- WGJM-LP in Englewood, Ohio
- WGNR in Anderson, Indiana
- WGOD in Charlotte Amalie, Virgin Islands
- WGRD in Grand Rapids, Michigan
- WHAV-LP in Haverhill, Massachusetts
- WIBB in Fort Valley, Georgia
- WIBT in Greenville, Mississippi
- WIHC in Newberry, Michigan
- WIIZ in Blackville, South Carolina
- WIYY in Baltimore, Maryland
- WJBQ in Portland, Maine
- WJLB in Detroit, Michigan
- WJWZ in Wetumpka, Alabama
- WKKW in Fairmont, West Virginia
- WKSL in Neptune Beach, Florida
- WKZB (FM) in Newton, Mississippi
- WLHR-LP in Maryville, Tennessee
- WMGA in Kenova, West Virginia
- WNBB in Bayboro, North Carolina
- WNCI in Columbus, Ohio
- WOFB-LP in Greeneville, Tennessee
- WPEG in Concord, North Carolina
- WPXY in Rochester, New York
- WREN-LP in Charlottesville, Virginia
- WRGE-LP in Ocala, Florida
- WRIP in Windham, New York
- WRMF in Palm Beach, Florida
- WSIX in Nashville, Tennessee
- WSKQ in New York, New York
- WSKS in Whitesboro, New York
- WSLM in Salem, Indiana
- WSNO-FM in Au Sable, New York
- WSPT in Stevens Point, Wisconsin
- WTRG in Gaston, North Carolina
- WTSM in Woodville, Florida
- WUCS in Windsor Locks, Connecticut
- WUTY-LP in Worcester, Massachusetts
- WVOK in Oxford, Alabama
- WWGL-LP in Steubenville, Ohio
- WXEF in Effingham, Illinois
- WXTA in Edinboro, Pennsylvania
- WXTB in Clearwater, Florida
- WXTF-LP in Harrisville, Michigan
- WZQQ in Hyden, Kentucky
- WZZU in Lynchburg, Virginia
