= KXZZ (AM) =

Coordinates: 30°15′28″N 93°11′55″W

- Lake Charles, Louisiana; United States
- Broadcast area: Lake Charles, Louisiana
- Frequency: 1580 kHz
- Branding: SportsRadio 1580

Programming
- Format: Defunct (was Sports)
- Affiliations: CBS Sports Radio

Ownership
- Owner: Cumulus Media; (Cumulus Licensing LLC)
- Sister stations: KAOK, KBIU, KKGB, KQLK, KYKZ

History
- First air date: 1947 (as KLOU)
- Former call signs: KLOU (1947–1985)
- Call sign meaning: "Z-16" (previous format)

Technical information
- Facility ID: 17016
- Class: B
- Power: 1,000 watts

Links
- Webcast: Listen Live
- Website: kxzz1580am.com

KXZZ (1580 AM) was a radio station broadcasting a sports format. It was licensed to Lake Charles, Louisiana, United States, and served the Lake Charles area. The station was last owned by Cumulus Media. Its studios were located on Broad Street in downtown Lake Charles and its transmitter was located north of downtown east of Calcasieu River.

== History ==
Logo until 2020

Frank R. Gibson obtained a construction permit to build a new 1,000-watt, daytime-only radio station in Lake Charles on October 16, 1946. The station went on air in 1947 as KLOU and joined CBS on November 1.

KXZZ's license was surrendered to the Federal Communications Commission and canceled on December 28, 2021.
