= WBFG =

WBFG may refer to:

- WBFG (FM), a radio station (96.5 FM) licensed to serve Parker's Crossroads, Tennessee, United States
- WDAY-TV, a television station (channel 6 analog/21 digital) licensed to serve Fargo, North Dakota, United States, which operated a cable-only station they referred to as WBFG
- WXEF, a radio station (97.9 FM) licensed to serve Effingham, Illinois, United States, which held the call sign WBFG from 1982 to 1993
- WDZH, a radio station (98.7 FM) licensed to serve Detroit, Michigan, United States, which held the call sign WBFG from 1961 to 1980
