= Bridge FM =

Bridge FM may refer to one of the following radio stations:

- Bridge FM (Wales), commercial radio station from Bridgend County Borough, Wales
- KYYR-LP, known as "The Bridge FM 97.9", a Christian radio station from Yakima, Washington, United States
- WKJD, a Christian radio station in Columbus, Indiana, United States
- WKTS, known as "The Bridge", a Christian radio station from Kingston, Tennessee, United States
- WRDR, known as "The Bridge FM", a Christian radio station from Freehold, New Jersey, United States
  - WJUX, a simulcast of WRDR, out of South Fallsburg, New York, United States
