= WLHR =

WLHR may refer to:

- WLHR-FM, a radio station (92.1 FM) licensed to Lavonia, Georgia, United States
- WLHR-LP, a low-power radio station (97.9 FM) licensed to Maryville, Tennessee, United States
