= Aue Stagecoach Inn =

- U.S. National Register of Historic Places
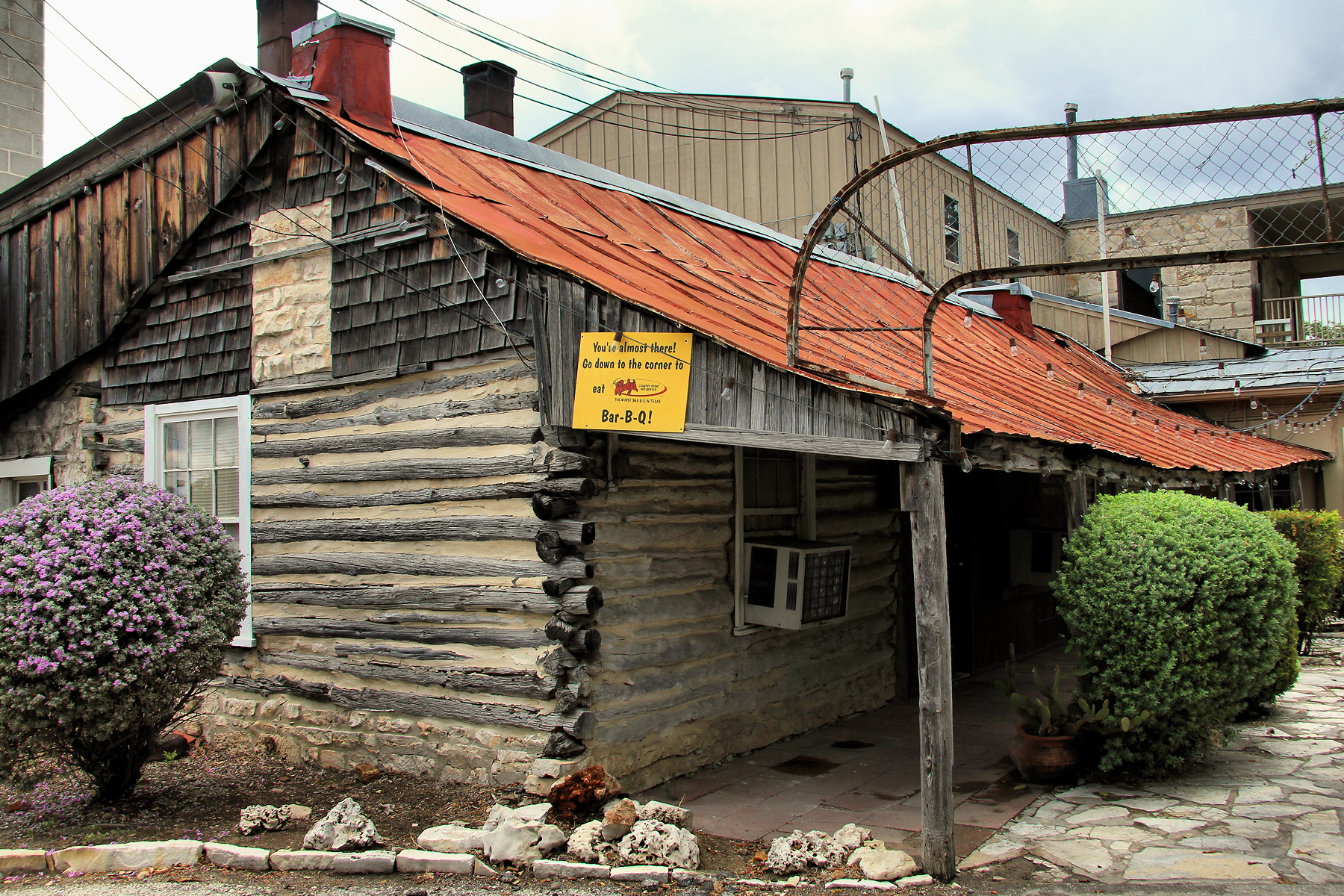
- 1857 dogtrot log cabin, part of Aue Stagecoach Inn

- Location within Texas Location within the United States
- Location: Boerne Stage Rd. and I-10, Leon Springs, Texas, US
- Coordinates: 29°39′55″N 98°37′43″W
- NRHP reference No.: 79002912
- Added to NRHP: August 1, 1979

Aue Stagecoach Inn is a complex of three structures built by German immigrant Max Aue and is located on Boerne Stage Rd. and I-10, in Leon Springs, county of Bexar, in the U.S. state of Texas. It was added to the National Register of Historic Places in 1979, and is an example of 19th century vernacular architecture of Texas.

== Saltbox house ==
Max Aue was born in Anhalt-Köthen, Germany in 1826 and immigrated to Texas in 1852. He purchased a tract of land from John O. Meusebach, on which in 1855 he built a 1 1/2 story saltbox limestone rubble house with exterior steps leading to a cellar. Inside the structure was a staircase leading to the upper loft that Aue used as his residence. The lower 2-room level functioned as a mercantile store. The house was a stop on the San Antonio-Boerne Stage Road. During the 1970s the saltbox house was given structural upgrades and expansions to convert it into a restaurant.

== Dog trot house ==
When he married Emma Toepperwein in February 1857, he built a 1-story stuccoed dog trot double-pen cedar log cabin as their new home. As the family grew, extensions were made to the cabin. The dog trot house was added to the San Antonio project of the Historic American Buildings Survey in 1968. The survey noted that the 2-chimneyed dirt floor house measured 27 by 57 feet (8.2 m × 17.4 m), and that the diameters of the individual logs measured 5–7 inches (130–180 mm).

== Greek revival hotel ==
A 2-story Greek Revival style structure was added to the complex in 1878, to function as a hotel for travelers along the stage route. In a reverse of how the original saltbox house functioned, the new 2-story house provided for family living quarters on the bottom floor. Guest quarters were on the second floor. The 2-story veranda was done in the Victorian style of architecture. When the San Antonio and Aransas Pass Railway connected San Antonio with a direct route to the Texas gulf coast in 1886, the railroad spur was 50 yards (46 m) from the Aue Hotel. The dog trot cabin was later incorporated into the hotel on the ground level through the south rooms and an interconnected shed.

== Gallery ==
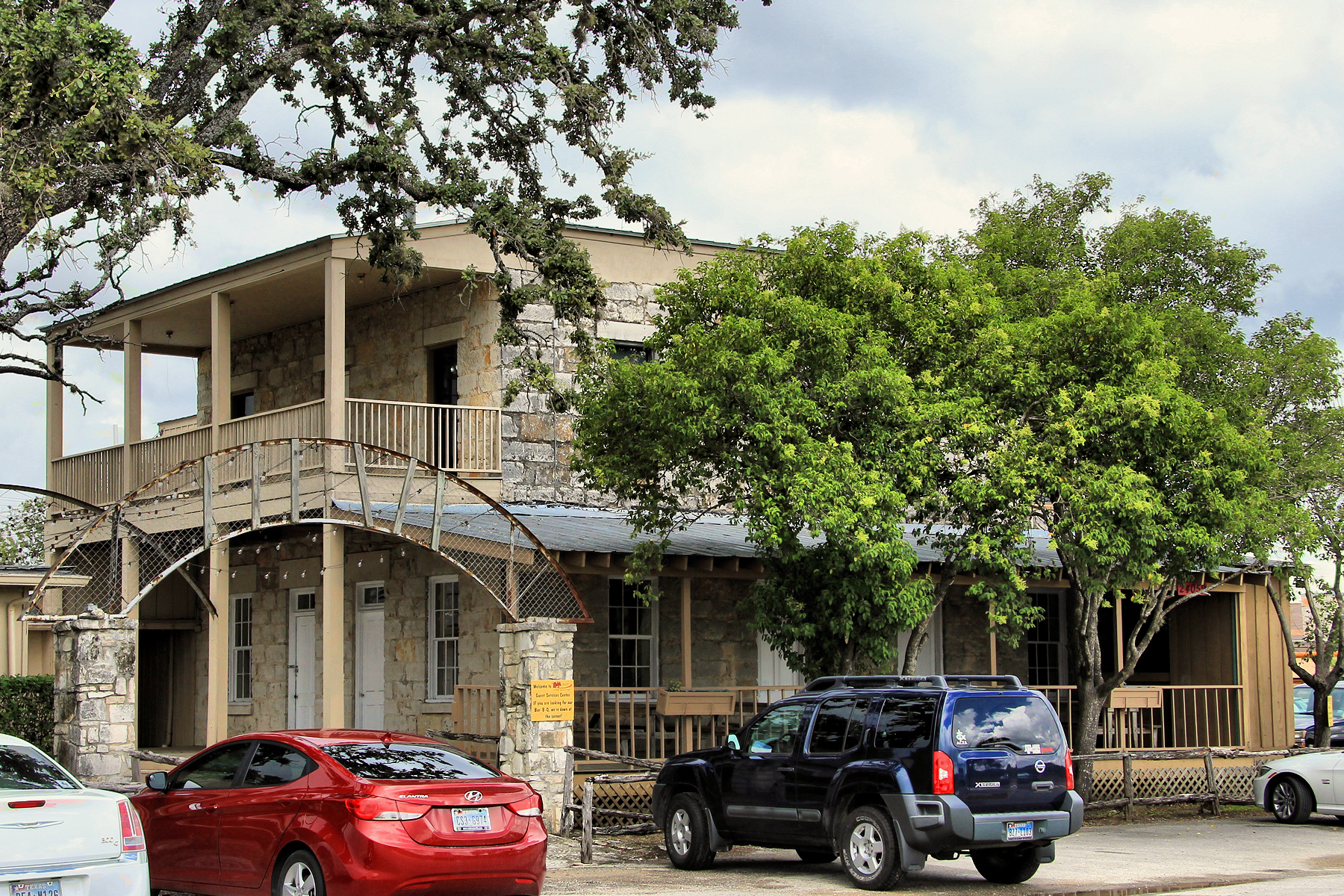
1878 Aue Hotel

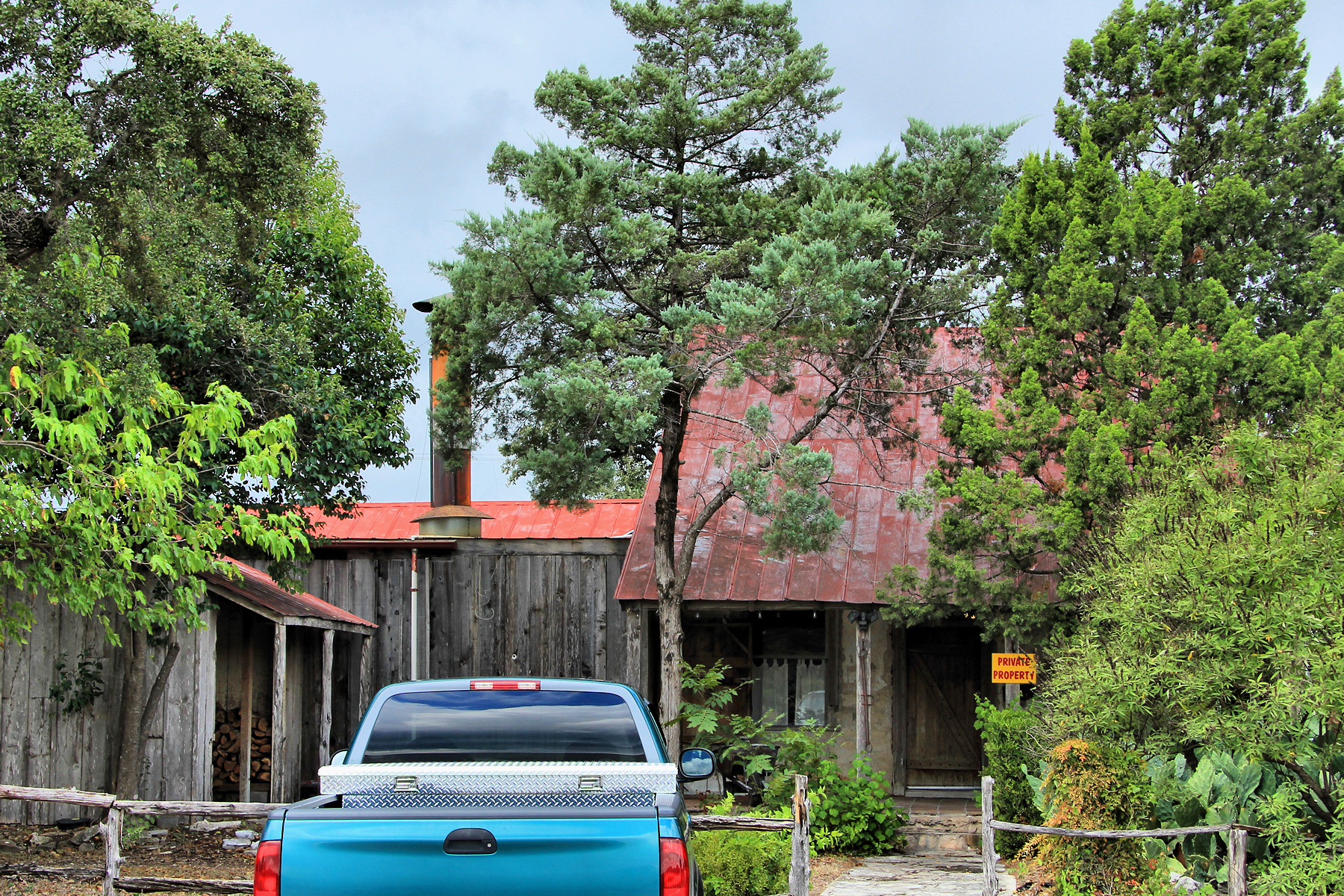
Front of the 1855 Aue saltbox house

== See also ==
- Rudolph Aue, the son of Max Aue founded Rudy's Country Store and Bar-B-Q in Leon Springs.
- The Plehwe Stagecoach Inn is just around the corner about 750 yards distance.
