= Leon Springs, Texas =

- Unincorporated community
- Location within Texas Location within the United States
- Coordinates: 29°39′54″N 98°37′45″W
- Country: United States
- State: Texas
- County: Bexar
- Elevation: 1,132 ft (345 m)
- Time zone: UTC-6 (Central (CST))
  - Summer (DST): UTC-5 (CDT)
- Area codes: 210, 726
- GNIS feature ID: 1339823

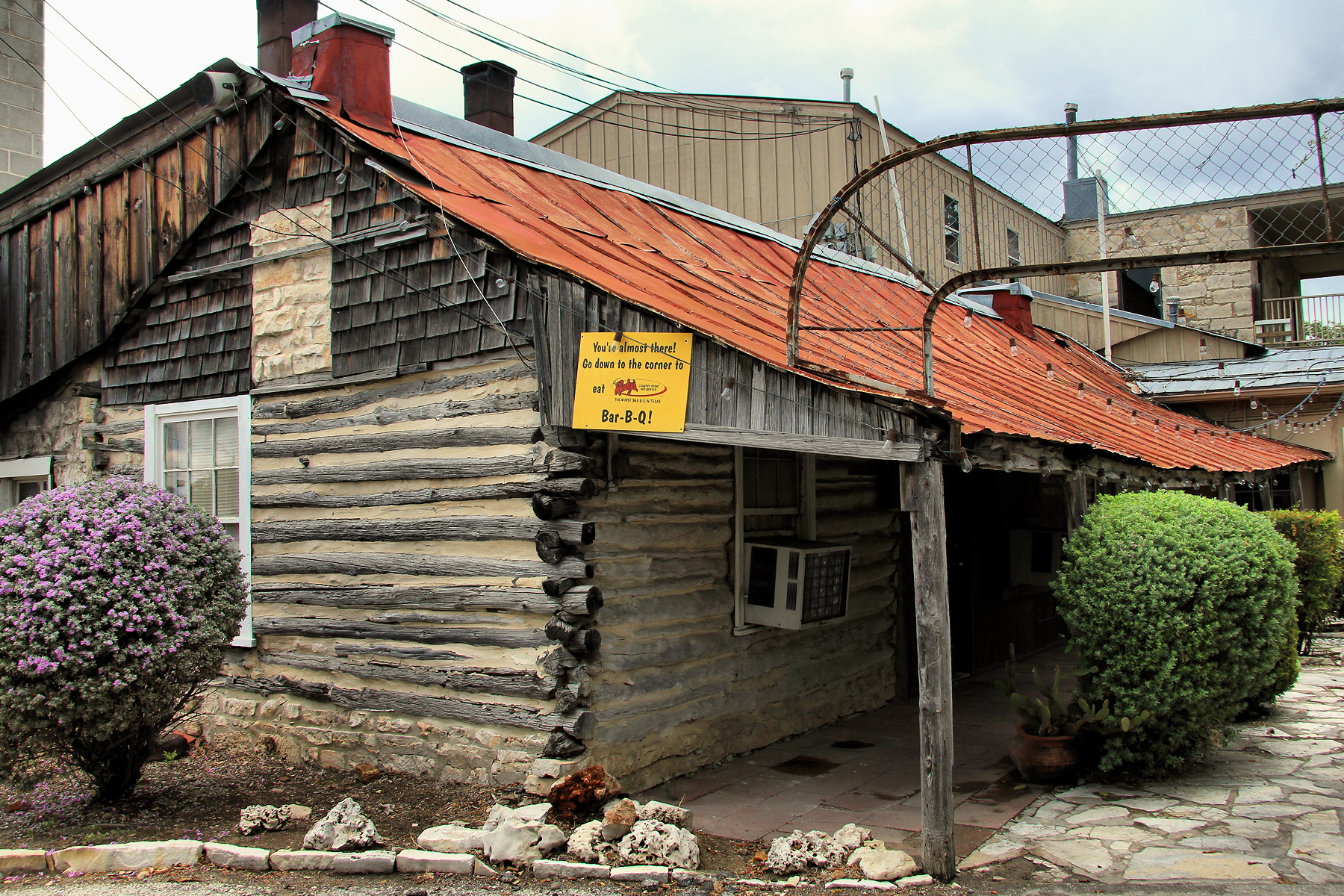
Historic dogtrot cabin of the Aue Stagecoach Inn

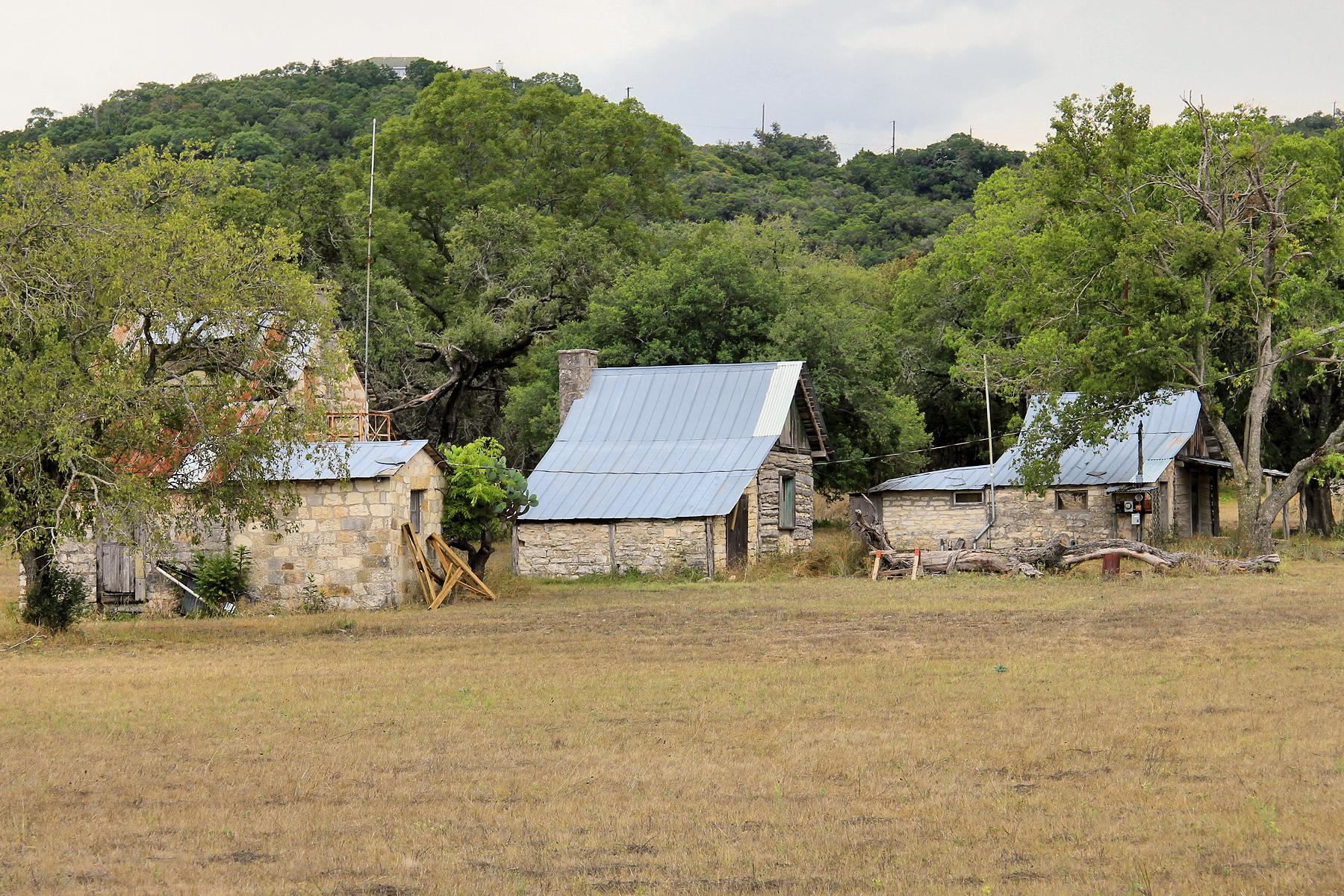
Historic saltbox houses of the Plehwe Complex

Leon Springs is an unincorporated community in Bexar County, Texas, United States, now partially within the city limits of San Antonio. According to the Handbook of Texas, the community had a population of 137 in 2000. It is located within the San Antonio Metropolitan Area.

== History ==
The region was settled in the mid-nineteenth century by German immigrants, most notably John O. Meusebach, George von Plehwe, and Max Aue. The Aue Stagecoach Inn became the first stop on the stagecoach route between San Antonio and San Diego, California. The community came to some prominence as the location of an officer training school at Camp Bullis. The original Romano's Macaroni Grill was founded in Leon Springs; however, the company closed down this branch after the second of two devastating floods in July 2002. It was operated by Brinker International. It is also the site for the first Rudy's Country Store and Bar-B-Q. The restaurant chain was created by a descendant of town founder Max Aue, Rudolph Aue. The community currently has Baptist, Roman Catholic, Presbyterian, and non-denominational churches.

The San Antonio and Aransas Pass Railway reached Leon Springs in 1887. The stop was originally called Aue Station.

== Education ==
Residents are in the Northside Independent School District.

Students are zoned to:

- Leon Springs Elementary School and Aue Elementary School
- Hector Garcia Middle School and Rawlinson Middle School
- Louis D. Brandeis High School and Tom C. Clark High School

== Notable people ==
- Andrew Davis Bruce, academic, soldier, and third president of the University of Houston.
- Henry W. Butner, a former Army officer.
- John M. Devine, a former Army officer.
- Louis R. Douglass, civil engineer who built army hospitals in Leon Springs.
- Aaron R. Fisher, a former Army officer.
- Anthony Franchini, guitarist.
- John Daniel Leinbach Hartman, a former United States Army officer.
- Doyle Overton Hickey, a former Army officer.
- Harry H. Johnson, a former Army officer.
- Lloyd E. Jones, a former Army officer.
- Louis Jordan, football player who served in World War I and was stationed at Camp Bullis.
- Lesley J. McNair, a former Army officer.
- Troy H. Middleton, a former Army officer, educator, and president at Louisiana State University.
- George Peddy, attorney, military officer, and political figure.
- Adolf Topperwein opened a shooting range in Leon Springs in 1951.
- Samuel Tankersley Williams, senior United States Army officer who attended Camp Bullis.
- Edwin A. Zundel, a former Army officer.

== Media ==
- KCJV-LP, an Oldies broadcast radio station for 97.9 FM, licensed in Leon Springs.
