= KXZZ =

KXZZ may refer to:

- KXZZ (FM), a radio station (100.1 FM) licensed to serve Dayton, Nevada, United States
- KXZZ (AM), a defunct radio station (1580 AM) formerly licensed to serve Lake Charles, Louisiana, United States
