= Louis Douglass =

Louis Douglass may refer to:

- Louis Douglas (1889–1939), American dancer, choreographer, and music businessman
- Louis R. Douglass (1888–1979), American civil engineer
