= Richard L. Bloch =

American investor (1920–2018)

- Born: June 12, 1929; Pontiac, Michigan, U.S.
- Died: October 27, 2018 (aged 89); Santa Fe, New Mexico, U.S.
- Education: University of Chicago; University of Arizona
- Occupations: Investor, real estate developer, banker, philanthropist
- Spouse: Nancy Bloch

Richard L. Bloch (June 12, 1929 – October 27, 2018) was an American investor, real estate developer, banker, and philanthropist.

== Biography ==
=== Early life ===
Richard L. Bloch was born on June 12, 1929, in Pontiac, Michigan. He graduated from the University of Chicago in Chicago, Illinois, with a Bachelor of Science degree in 1949. He then attended graduate school at the University of Arizona in Tucson, Arizona, from 1950 to 1952. Meanwhile, he also served in the Anti-Aircraft Artillery of the United States Army during the Korean War from 1951 to 1953, retiring as a first lieutenant.

=== Career ===
In 1957, he founded a real estate development company in California and Arizona. He co-developed and owned the Gulf & Western Building in New York City, a Hyatt Hotel in Los Angeles, California, the Transamerica Building in Tucson, Arizona. Additionally, he owned buildings used by IBM and Allstate Insurance. He served as the Chairman of the Board of Trust Managers of Columbus Realty Trust.

He became President and majority owner of the Phoenix Suns, an NBA basketball team, in 1968. He served as Chairman of the Board of Governors of the National Basketball Association. In 1973, he purchased KVOA, a television station in Tucson, Arizona affiliated with NBC. He was also co-owner of KNYN and KTMN, two radio stations based in Santa Fe, New Mexico. From 1976 to 1982, he served as the Chief Executive Officer of Filmways, including its subsidiaries, Union Fidelity Insurance and Grosset & Dunlap.

He served on the Board of Directors of Glenayre Technology (previously known as Nu-West) from 1987 to 1992, the Data Broadcasting Corporation from 1993 to 1995 and Ascendant Solutions from March 2002 to February 16, 2005. In 1997, he co-founded CLB Partners, and served as its co-manager. He served on the Board of Directors of City National Bank, headquartered in Beverly Hills, California, beginning in 1979.

He was a major donor to Democratic candidates. During the tenure of President Bill Clinton, he served on the President's Foreign Intelligence Advisory Board.

=== Philanthropy ===
He is a former trustee of the American Film Institute and the Museum of New Mexico Foundation. He served on the Boards of Trustees of the American Grand Prix Association, the United States Equestrian Team, the American Ballet Theatre in New York City, St. Vincent's Hospital in Santa Fe, New Mexico, the La Jolla Playhouse in La Jolla near San Diego.

=== Personal life ===
He was married to Nancy Bloch. He had been the owner of Pinon Farm in Santa Fe, New Mexico, since 1982. Bloch died on October 27, 2018, at the age of 89 after a fall.
