= KMAI =

KMAI may refer to:

- Marianna Municipal Airport (ICAO code KMAI)
- KMAI-LP, a low-power radio station (97.9 FM) licensed to serve Alturas, California, United States
