= XHMJ-FM =

Radio station in Piedras Negras, Coahuila

- Piedras Negras, Coahuila; Mexico
- Frequency: 97.9 MHz
- Branding: Región 97.9 FM

Programming
- Format: Regional Mexican

Ownership
- Owner: Capital Media; (Radiodifusoras Capital, S.A. de C.V.)
- Operator: Grupo Región

History
- First air date: June 11, 1941 (concession)

Technical information
- Licensing authority: CRT
- Class: A
- ERP: 3 kW
- HAAT: −10.8 m (−35 ft)
- Transmitter coordinates: 28°42′46″N 100°32′49.5″W

Links
- Webcast: Listen live
- Website: Capital Coahuila Website

XHMJ-FM is a radio station on 97.9 FM in Piedras Negras, Coahuila. It is owned by Capital Media and operated by Grupo Región, and carries a Regional Mexican format known as "Región 97.9 FM".

== History ==
XHMJ began as XEMJ-AM 920, receiving its concession on June 11, 1941. It was owned by Radio Popular Fronteriza, S.A., the concessionaire for the station for 74 years.

It migrated to FM in 2013 and was sold to Capital Media in 2015. In 2019, XHMJ was converted from its pop music known Capital FM to a Regional Mexican format known as Capital Máxima.

On June 8, 2020, XHMJ was one of seven stations to debut the new Lokura FM Spanish-language adult hits brand. However, the station quickly flipped back. On July 29, it was revealed that David Aguillón, a former PRI political figure, would lease Capital's four Coahuila radio stations; the formation of Grupo Región was formally announced on September 14.
