= XHMX-FM =

Radio station in Tapachula, Chiapas, Mexico

- Tapachula, Chiapas; Mexico
- Frequency: 97.9 FM
- Branding: Máxima FM

Programming
- Format: Pop

Ownership
- Owner: Radio S.A.; (Organización Radiofónica Estereofiel, S.A. de C.V.)

History
- First air date: May 16, 1978 (concession)

Technical information
- Class: AA
- ERP: 3.189 kW
- HAAT: 60 m
- Transmitter coordinates: 14.921145°N 92.270315°W

Links
- Webcast: Listen live
- Website: maxima.com.mx

XHMX-FM is a radio station in Tapachula, Chiapas, Mexico. Owned by Radio S.A., XHMX broadcasts on 97.9 FM and is known as Máxima.

== History ==
XHMX received its concession on May 16, 1978 and was originally owned by Blanca Julia Águilar Trujillo. The Águilar Trujillo family was involved in the ownership of other radio stations in Chiapas; it founded XHKR-FM in Tuxtla Gutiérrez, which remains a sister to XHMX.
