= Edwin A. Zundel =

US Army general (1893–1985)

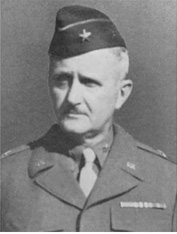
- Born: 29 March 1893; Greensburg, Pennsylvania, U.S.
- Died: 13 February 1985 (aged 91); Bradenton, Florida, U.S.
- Burial place: Arlington National Cemetery
- Military career
- Allegiance: United States
- Branch: United States Army
- Service years: 1915–1953
- Rank: Brigadier general
- Commands: Counter Intelligence Corps; 41st Infantry Division Artillery
- Conflicts: World War I: Pancho Villa Expedition; Meuse-Argonne Offensive; World War II: Bismarck Archipelago; New Guinea campaign; Southern Philippines campaign; Occupation of Japan; Korean War
- Awards: Silver Star Medal; Legion of Merit (3); Bronze Star Medal; Air Medal

Edwin Albert Zundel (29 March 1893 – 13 February 1985) was a United States Army brigadier general who served on the Western Front during World War I, in the Southwest Pacific Area during World War II, and as Inspector General, Far East Command, and Inspector General, United Nations Troops—Korea during the Korean War. He was a member of the West Point class of 1915, "the class the stars fell on" that also included Omar Bradley and Dwight Eisenhower.

Zundel commanded an artillery battalion on the Western Front during World War I, and was artillery officer of the Sixth United States Army in the Southwest Pacific Area during World War II, participating in many of the operations there. In May 1944 he became commander of the 41st Infantry Division Artillery, and was decorated for gallantry in the Battle of Biak and the Battle of Mindanao. After the war he became chief of the Counter Intelligence Corps and commandant of its Corps School. He served in the Korean War as Inspector General, Far East Command, and Inspector General, United Nations Command.

== Early life ==
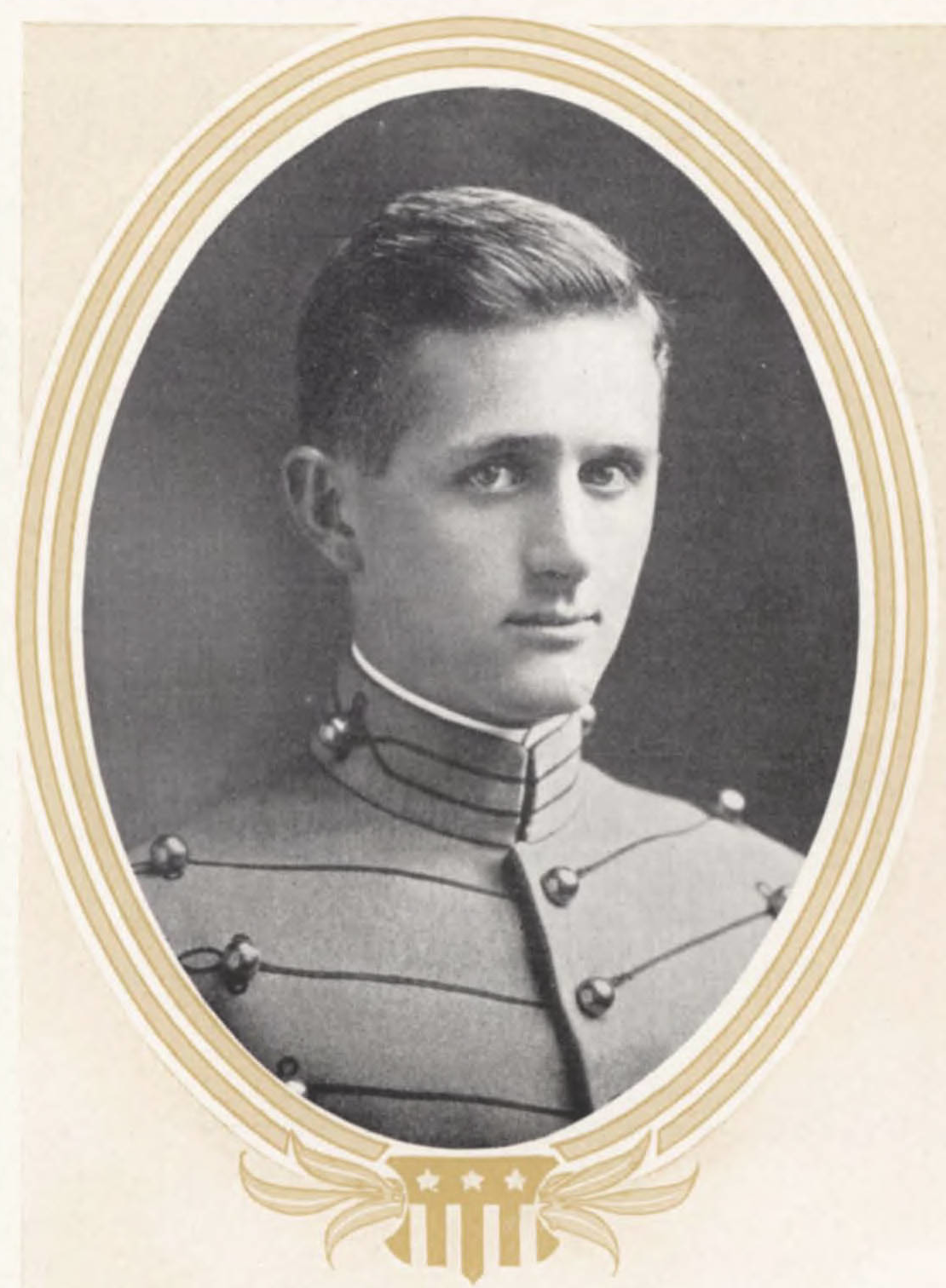
At West Point in 1915

Edwin Albert Zundel was born in Greensburg, Pennsylvania, on 29 March 1893, the only son of Henry McClellan Zundel and his wife Elizabeth née Wineman. He had four sisters: Bertha, Carolyn, Anna and Mary. His early life was spent in Greensburg, where he went to school. He played football and for a time considered becoming a Lutheran minister.

Congressman George F. Huff appointed Zundel to the United States Military Academy at West Point, New York, which he entered on 12 June 1911. The class he joined would become famous as the class the stars fell on. Of the 164 graduates that year, 59, including Zundel, would wear the stars of a general officer, the most of any class in the history of the Academy. Classmates included Omar Bradley and Dwight D. Eisenhower. At West Point he played on the polo team.

== World War I ==
Zundel was commissioned as an additional second lieutenant in the 3d Field Artillery on graduation on 12 June 1915. He was ranked 29th in the class. It was the largest graduating class up to that time, and the Army had only 105 slots available for them. His first posting was therefore to Fort Sam Houston, Texas. He was transferred to the 4th Field Artillery on 2 November 1915, and then the 6th Field Artillery on 5 January 1916. The 6th Field Artillery operated in support of units on the Mexican Border with the Pancho Villa Expedition. He was promoted to first lieutenant on 1 July 1916, and then captain on 15 May 1917.

On 4 September 1917, Zundel went to Leon Springs, Texas, as an instructor at the 2d Officers' Training Camp. He was subsequently posted to Douglas, Arizona, on 30 November 1917, and then to the United States Army Field Artillery School at Fort Sill, Oklahoma, on 4 February 1918. On 19 April 1918, he joined the 11th Field Artillery at Camp Doniphan, Oklahoma, where he was promoted to major on 3 July 1918. Two days later the 11th Field Artillery began moving to France for service on the Western Front. Zundel served as a battalion commander in the 78th Field Artillery at the Artillery Training Center at Camp Valdahon until 12 October 1918, when he joined III Corps Headquarters as the corps counter battery staff officer. On 1 November 1918, he joined the 305th Field Artillery as a battalion commander.

== Between the wars ==
With World War I over, Zundel returned to the United States, where he served with the Quartermaster Corps at Camp Meade, Maryland, and then in San Antonio, Texas. He reverted to the rank of captain on 6 May 1920, but became a major again on 1 July, when he was sent to Hawaii to command a battalion of the 13th Field Artillery at Schofield Barracks. He reverted to the rank of captain again on 4 November 1922. On 7 June 1923, he was appointed an instructor in mathematics at West Point. He was promoted to major again on 5 February 1924.

From 1927 to 1928, Zundel was an Advanced Course student at the Field Artillery School at Fort Sill. He married Eleanor Clay Lewis at the West Point Cadet Chapel on 14 July 1928. They had a daughter, Eleanor, who was born in 1932. From 1928 to 1930, Zundel attended the Command and General Staff School at Fort Leavenworth, Kansas. He was a field artillery instructor with the Rhode Island National Guard's 68th Field Artillery Brigade and 103d Field Artillery at Providence, Rhode Island, from 1930 to 1934, and then went to Washington, D.C., where he served with the National Guard Bureau from 1934 to 1938. Some 18 years after he was first promoted to major, he was finally promoted to lieutenant colonel on 1 May 1936.

== World War II ==
After a quick refresher course at Fort Sill, Zundel assumed command of the 2d Battalion, 83d Field Artillery, at Fort Bragg, North Carolina. In July 1940 he assumed command of the 83d Field Artillery at Fort Benning, Georgia, where he also served as the artillery officer of the 4th Infantry Division. In October 1940 he became commander of the 42d Field Artillery Battalion there. The following year he became the commander of the 1st Antitank Group at Camp Claiborne, Louisiana. He was promoted to colonel on 14 October 1941, and in December became the artillery officer of II Corps, which was based in Wilmington, Delaware, and then in Jacksonville, Florida. He became artillery officer of the XI Corps, then based in Chicago, in June 1942.

In February 1943, Lieutenant General Walter Krueger, the commander of the Sixth United States Army, picked Zundel as his artillery officer. He was soon on his way to Brisbane, Australia. As Sixth Army Artillery Officer participated in a number of operations in the Southwest Pacific Area, including Operation Chronicle, the landings on Woodlark and Kiriwina Islands; Operation Dexterity, the landings at Arawe and Cape Gloucester; the Admiralty Islands campaign; and Operation Reckless, the landings at Hollandia. For his services with the Sixth Army, he was awarded the Legion of Merit.

On 24 May 1944 Zundel assumed command of the 41st Infantry Division Artillery, with the rank of brigadier general. He led this command with distinction in the Battle of Wakde, the Battle of Biak, and the Battle of Mindanao. For Biak, he was awarded oak leaf cluster to his Legion of Merit, and the Silver Star for gallantry in action at Ibdi on 29 May 1944. He was awarded a second oak leaf cluster to his Legion of Merit for the fighting on Mindanao, along with the Bronze Star Medal. He received the Air Medal in July 1945 for flights over enemy territory. These included flights in U.S. Marine Corps Douglas SBD Dauntlesses of VMSB-243.

== Postwar ==
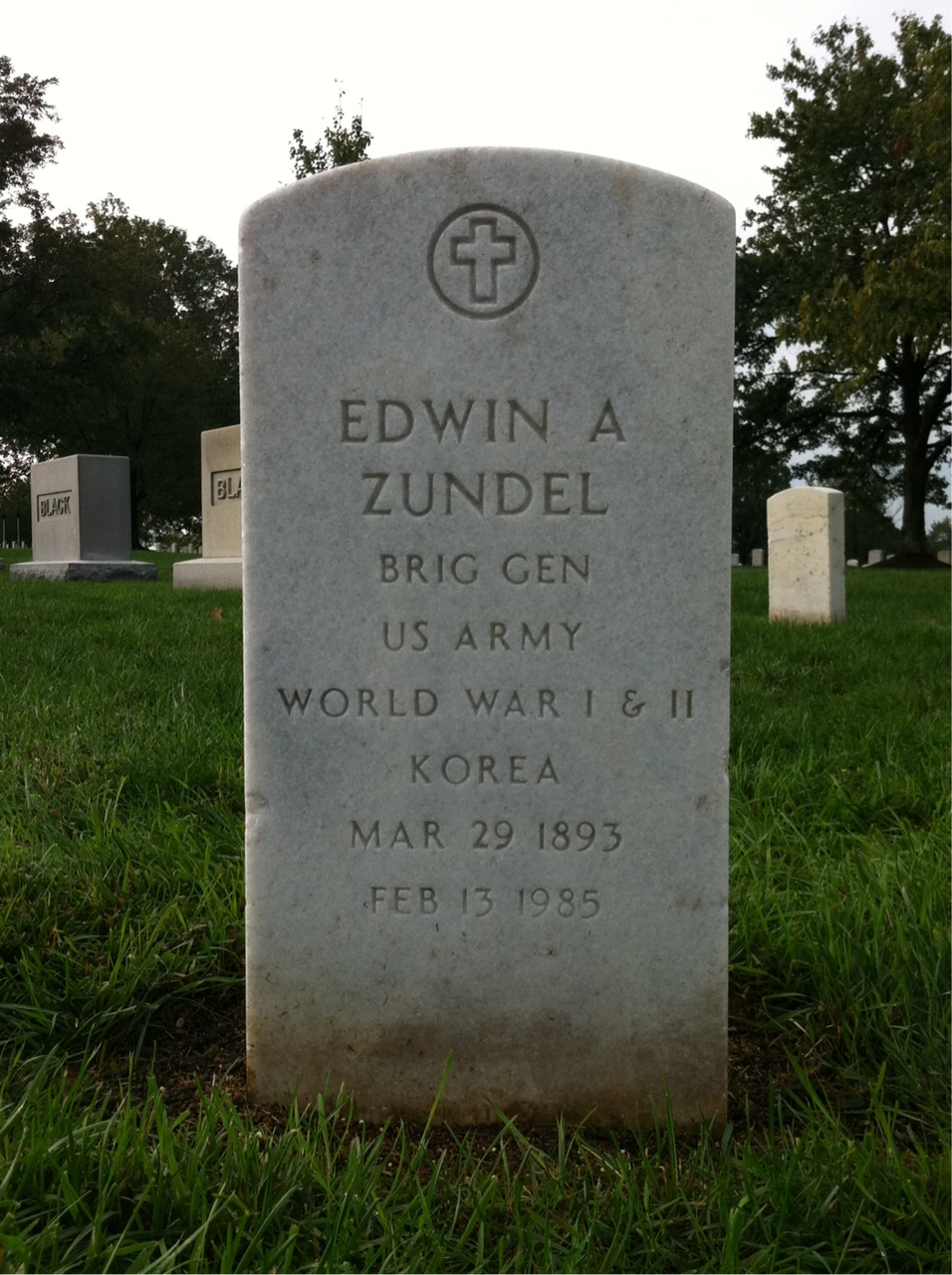
Grave at Arlington National Cemetery

After the war ended, Zundel participated in the occupation of Japan. The 41st Infantry Division was inactivated on 31 December 1945, but he remained at Kure until February 1946, when he returned to the United States, and became artillery officer of the Fourth United States Army, the headquarters of which was located at Fort Sam Houston, Texas, where his career had begun. In January 1948, Zundel became chief of the Counter Intelligence Corps and commandant of its Corps School at Fort Holabird, Maryland. His rank of brigadier general became permanent, with seniority backdated to 7 July 1944.

In November 1949, Zundel returned to Japan as Inspector General, Far East Command. After the outbreak of the Korean War in June 1950, he became Inspector General, United Nations Command in Korea. Called upon to investigate the poor performance of the 24th Infantry, he attributed it not to the regiment being predominantly African-American, but to the fact that 62 percent of its men were in categories IV and V on the Army General Classification Test - the lowest scores. Zundel recommended that units of the Far East Command, including those fighting in Korea, be racially integrated by assigning replacements to units regardless of race.

Zundel retired from the Army on 31 January 1953, and moved to Sarasota, Florida, where he resided until his death in Manatee Memorial Hospital in Bradenton, Florida, on 13 February 1985. On 19 February 1985, he was interred at Arlington National Cemetery alongside his wife Eleanor Lewis who died on 16 April 1968. He was survived by his daughter, Eleanor Phillips, and two grandchildren.
