= Adolph Toepperwein =

American exhibition shooter (1869–1962)

- Toepperwein circa 1950-1960
- Born: October 16, 1869; Boerne, Texas, U.S.
- Died: March 4, 1962 (aged 92); San Antonio, Texas, U.S.
- Known for: Exhibition shooting

Adolph Toepperwein (October 16, 1869 – March 4, 1962) with his wife toured as the Fabulous Topperweins as exhibition shooters.

== Biography ==
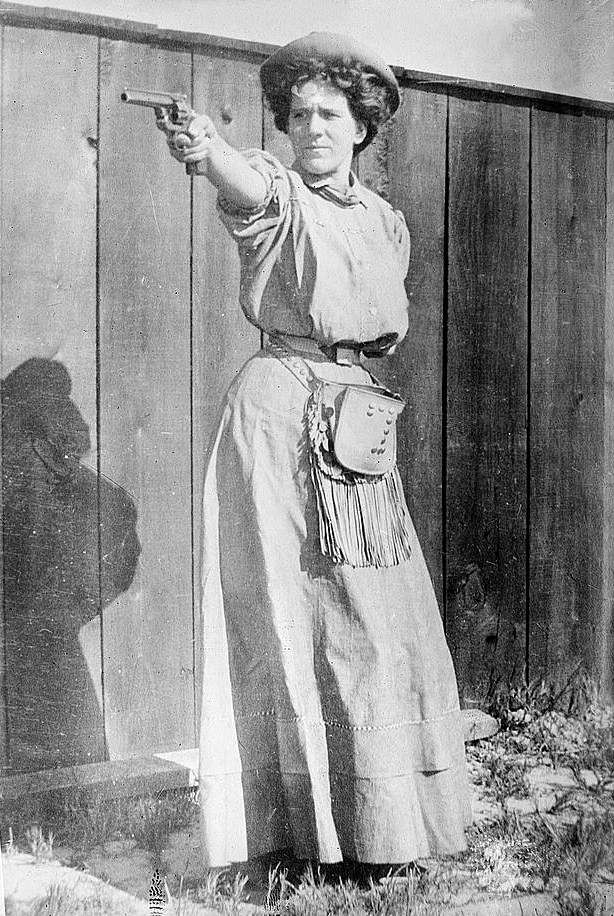
Elizabeth Toepperwein

He was born on October 16, 1869, in Boerne, Texas, to Johanna Bergman and Ferdinand Toepperwein. In 1903, he married Elizabeth Servaty (known as "Plinky") of New Haven, Connecticut. In 1951, he stopped touring and opened a shooting camp in Leon Springs, Texas.

He died in San Antonio, Texas, on March 4, 1962. He was buried in Mission Burial Park.

== Legacy ==
A Toepperwein museum was opened in May 1973 in San Antonio, Texas.
