= XHZHZ-TDT =

Public TV station in Zacatecas, Mexico

- Zacatecas, Zacatecas; Mexico
- Channels: Digital: 24 (UHF); Virtual: 24
- Branding: Canal 24; SIZART

Programming
- Subchannels: 24.1: Canal 24; 24.2: Once Niñas y Niños; 24.3 Aprende En Casa; 24.4 UAZ TV

Ownership
- Owner: Gobierno del Estado de Zacatecas
- Sister stations: XHZH-FM

History
- Founded: February 22, 2016
- Call sign meaning: Derived from XHZH-FM, the state radio station

Technical information
- Licensing authority: CRT
- ERP: 41.9 kW
- HAAT: 527.6 m (1,731 ft)
- Transmitter coordinates: 22°44′23.2″N 102°33′21.3″W

Links
- Website: www.sizart.org.mx

XHZHZ-TDT is a television station on channel 24 in Zacatecas, Zacatecas, operated by the Sistema Zacatecano de Radio y Televisión (Zacatecan Radio and Television System, SIZART), a branch of the state government.

The station is colocated with XHZH-FM 97.9 at the Instituto Zacatecano de la Cultura, with its transmitter on a tower shared with the SPR on Cerro de la Virgen.

== History ==
The state government received the public use concession for XHZHZ in August 2015. The station was the first new TV station in Mexico, alongside XHUJAT-TDT, to receive a public use concession. Program testing began in December 2015.

SIZART was formally created on January 13, 2016, and the station was to begin operations on February 15, making Zacatecas the 26th state to operate its own state network. Instead, the station launched the next week, on February 22.

Programs will come from new offerings, existing radio programs, and also from typical program suppliers to the state networks, including national public broadcasters and Deutsche Welle. Local productions will include concerts, newscasts, and fitness programs.

In February 2018, XHZHZ was approved to add Once Niñas y Niños, a channel from Canal Once, as a second digital subchannel. Once Niñas y Niños is not normally carried in cities like Zacatecas where the IPN does not have its own TV transmitter.
