= XHPXA-FM =

Community radio station in San Miguel Xaltepec, Palmar de Bravo, Puebla

San Miguel Xaltepec, Puebla; Mexico
- Frequency: 97.9 MHz
- Branding: Radio Xalli

Ownership
- Owner: Comunicadores Filo de Tierra Colorada, A.C.

History
- First air date: 1985; 2010 (with permit)
- Call sign meaning: Puebla XAltepec

Technical information
- ERP: .25 kW

Links
- Website: radioxalli979.com.mx

XHPXA-FM is a community radio station on 97.9 FM in San Miguel Xaltepec, Puebla. XHPXA is owned by Comunicadores Filo de Tierra Colorada, A.C. and is known as Radio Xalli.

== History ==
The history of Radio Xalli reaches back to 1985, when Hilario Cruz wanted to form a community radio station to serve San Miguel Xaltepec.

From the mid-1990s, the station grew thanks to an alliance with a Mexico City-based promoter, obtaining programs from Radio Educación and connection with AMARC México, the national association of community radio broadcasters. The station broadcast through loudspeakers placed throughout the community.

From February to November 2007, Radio Xalli moved to FM for the first time. However, at that time, only a handful of community radio stations held permits, and the station was forced off air as a pirate.

On February 19, 2010, Radio Xalli obtained a permit to return to air, this time on 97.9 with the callsign XHPXA-FM. It was among a wave of six community radio stations awarded permits by Cofetel.
