= John Daniel Leinbach Hartman =

United States Army general

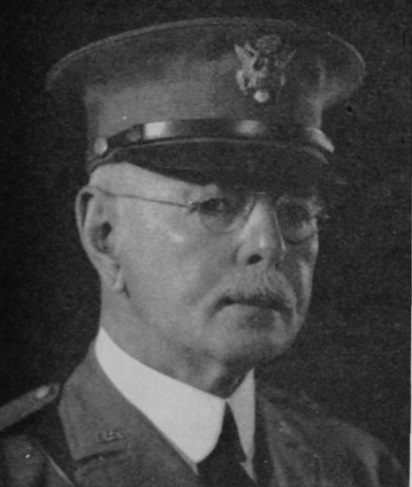
- From the April 1954 edition of Assembly magazine
- Born: August 9, 1865; Pennsylvania
- Died: July 29, 1953 (aged 87); Seattle, Washington
- Spouse: Helen Canby Ward
- Children: 2
- Military career
- Allegiance: United States
- Branch: United States Army
- Service years: 1888–1929
- Rank: Brigadier General
- Service number: 0-207
- Conflicts: Ghost Dance War • Battle of Wounded Knee; Spanish–American War • Siege of Santiago; Philippine–American War; Border War (1910–19)
- Awards: Silver Star

John Daniel Leinbach Hartman (August 9, 1865 – July 29, 1953) was a United States Army officer in the late 19th and early 20th centuries. He served in several conflicts, including the Spanish–American War and World War I.

== Military career ==
Hartman was born in Pennsylvania on August 9, 1865. He graduated 20th in a class of 44 from the United States Military Academy in June 1888. Among his classmates there were several men who would, like Hartman himself, eventually attain the rank of general officer, such as Peyton C. March, William M. Morrow, William Robert Dashiell, Robert Lee Howze, Peter Charles Harris, Eli Alva Helmick, Henry Jervey, William Voorhees Judson, John Louis Hayden, Edward Anderson, James W. McAndrew, Charles Aloysius Hedekin and William S. Peirce.

Hartman was commissioned into the 1st Cavalry Regiment, doing frontier duty from 1888 to 1895. He was originally stationed at Fort Assinniboine and participated in the Ghost Dance War, including the Battle of Wounded Knee. Hartman then served in Arizona Territory and New Mexico Territory from 1892 to 1895. He served in Cuba during the Spanish–American War, participating in the Siege of Santiago, for which he received the Silver Star. Hartman went to the Philippines in August 1900 because of the Philippine–American War, and he was promoted to the rank of captain on February 2, 1901.

After returning to the U.S., Hartman taught at Fort Leavenworth for three years, was stationed at Fort Riley for one year, and then went back to the Philippines to serve as a regimental adjutant at Fort Stotsenburg, remaining there for two years. Hartman took leave on the way back to the U.S., passing through India, the Suez Canal, and Europe. After his promotion to major of the 4th Cavalry Regiment on September 11, 1911, Hartman served at Fort Bliss until 1912. He served as a quartermaster of the Blue Army at the Connecticut Maneuvers in 1912, and he was in charge of manufacturing at Schuylkill Arsenal around the same time. In 1915, Hartman stationed at the border with Mexico, serving with the 3rd Cavalry Regiment. After his promotion to lieutenant colonel on July 1, 1916, Hartman assumed command over the First Provisional Cavalry Regiment, and after his promotion to colonel on May 5, 1917, he commanded the 6th Cavalry Regiment stationed at Marfa, Texas. He later commanded an officers training camp in Leon Springs, Texas, as well as the 17th Cavalry Regiment in Douglas, Arizona.

Hartman was promoted to the rank of brigadier general on October 1, 1918, and he held command over a training camp in Waco, Texas. After World War I ended, Hartman reverted to his permanent rank of colonel, and he returned to the 17th Cavalry in Arizona. The regiment was moved to Schofield Barracks in Hawaii, and Hartman commanded it until July 1, 1922. He was reassigned to the Signal Corps, where he remained until August 9, 1929, when he retired. Congress restored his brigadier general rank on June 21, 1930.

Hartman lived in Seattle during his retirement. He died there on July 29, 1953.

== Personal life ==
Hartman married Helen Canby Ward (November 16, 1875 – February 11, 1954) while on frontier duty early in his career. They had two sons. Hartman and his wife are interred at the Fort Lawton Post Cemetery.
