= Plehwe Complex =

Historic house in Texas, United States

- U.S. National Register of Historic Places
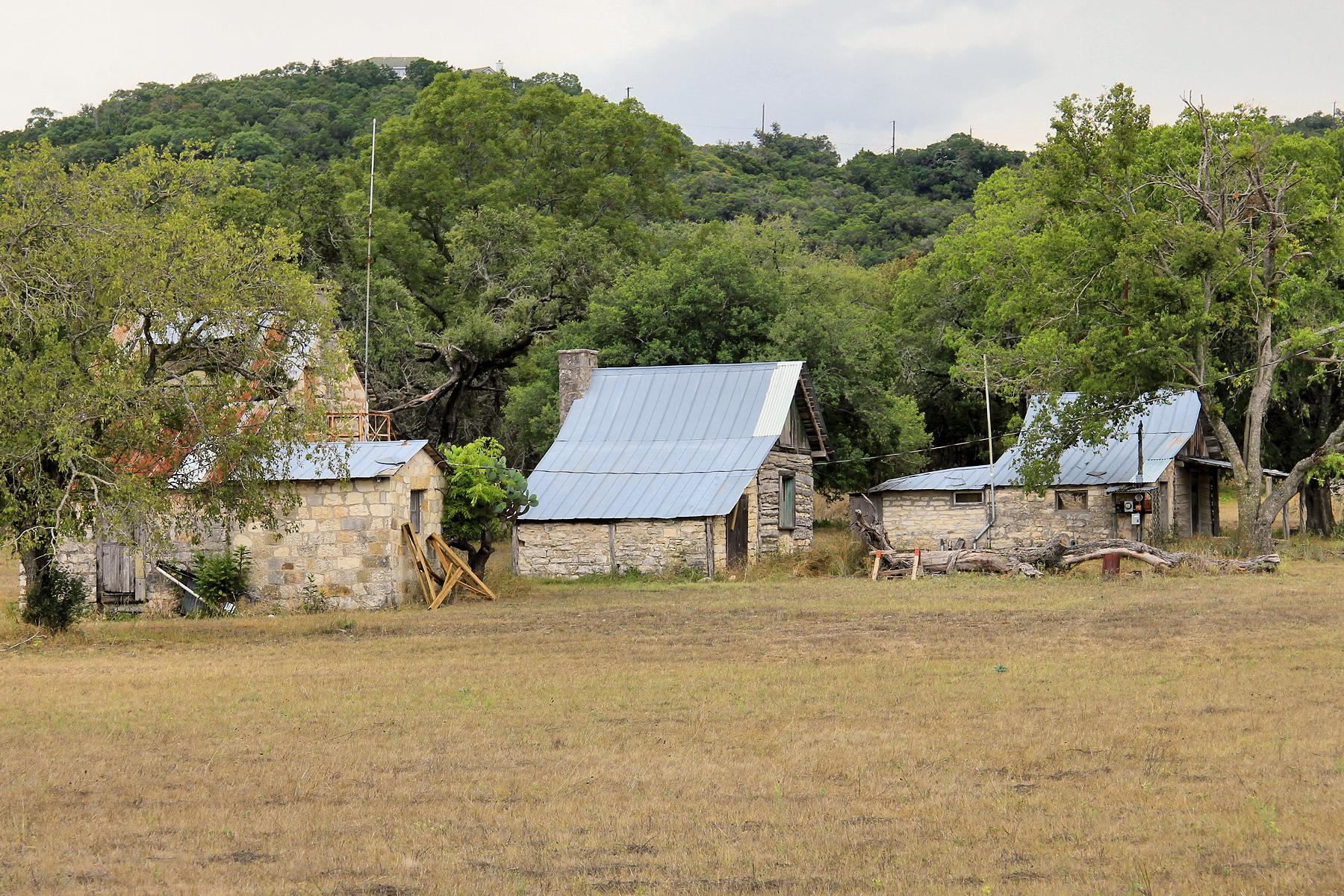
- Plehwe Complex, 2013

- Location within Texas Location within the United States
- Nearest city: Leon Springs, Texas
- Coordinates: 29°39′54″N 98°38′10″W
- Area: less than one acre
- Built: 1855
- NRHP reference No.: 83003755
- Added to NRHP: December 15, 1983

The Plehwe Complex is a set of historic saltbox houses on Boerne Stage Road near Leon Springs in Bexar County, Texas, United States. The place is also known as Plehwe Stage Coach Inn, a competitor to the Aue Stage Coach Inn just around the corner in 750 yards distance. The buildings were added to the National Register of Historic Places on December 15, 1983.

== Owners ==
The original owners were Capt. Charles Felix George von Plehwe and his spouse Mina Sophie von Plehwe, who had two children, Pauline and Frederick. George, as he was called, was the nephew of Senior General Bernard von Plehwe of the Prussian Cavalry. George's brother, Otto von Plehwe (a.k.a. Fritz von Plehwe), immigrated in 1868 together with his orderly, the former valet of his father, Joseph Peter Potschernick. Joseph had the fare to return to Germany but elected to remain with the von Plehwe family in the United States.

The buildings on a 100-acre ground are now owned and maintained by George Strait.
