= XHZH-FM =

Public radio station in Zacatecas

- Zacatecas, Zacatecas; Mexico
- Broadcast area: Zacatecas
- Frequency: 97.9 MHz
- Branding: Radio Zacatecas

Programming
- Format: Cultural

Ownership
- Owner: Government of the State of Zacatecas (Sistema Zacatecano de Radio y Televisión)
- Sister stations: XHZHZ-TDT

History
- First air date: April 1984

Technical information
- Licensing authority: CRT
- Class: B
- ERP: 10,000 watts
- HAAT: 405.5 m (1,330 ft)

Links
- Website: www.sizart.org.mx

XHZH-FM is a radio station owned by the government of the Mexican state of Zacatecas. It is known as Radio Zacatecas and carries a cultural format.

Radio Zacatecas came to air in April 1984 and was reorganized into the Sistema Zacatecano de Radio y Televisión (Zacatecas Radio and Television System) with the sign-on of state-owned XHZHZ-TDT in February 2016.
