= KAOK =

- Lake Charles, Louisiana; United States
- Broadcast area: Lake Charles area
- Frequency: 1400 kHz
- Branding: Super Talk 1400

Programming
- Format: Talk radio
- Affiliations: Fox News Radio; NBC News Radio; Premiere Networks; Salem Radio Network; Westwood One

Ownership
- Owner: Cumulus Media; (Cumulus Licensing LLC)
- Sister stations: KBIU, KKGB, KQLK, KYKZ

History
- First air date: May 10, 1947
- Former call signs: KLOU
- Call sign meaning: Originally owned by the OK Group

Technical information
- Licensing authority: FCC
- Facility ID: 67330
- Class: C
- Power: 1,000 watts
- Transmitter coordinates: 30°14′10″N 93°10′2″W

Links
- Public license information: Public file; LMS
- Webcast: Listen live
- Website: kaok.com

KAOK (1400 AM, "SuperTalk 1400") is a commercial radio station licensed to Lake Charles, Louisiana, United States, and featuring a talk format. it is owned by Cumulus Media and features programming from Westwood One, Premiere Networks and the Salem Radio Network. Its studios are on Broad Street in downtown Lake Charles and its transmitter is at the intersection of Fruge Street (US 90) and I-210.

== History ==
=== Early years ===
The station signed on the air on May 10, 1947. It began as a member of the "OK Group" which included WAOK, WBOK and KYOK, serving the African-American community. Thomas Austin Gresham (1921–2015), a 1946 graduate of Louisiana State University in Baton Rouge, who was born in Buenos Aires, Argentina, opened the station. Its original call sign was KLOU. Gresham served as the general manager and part owner of the station.

In 1959, Gresham came to Shreveport to manage KRMD and was the executor of the T. B. Lanford estate. Gresham was also a decorated first lieutenant with the 8th Air Force of the United States Army Air Corps in England during World War II. He flew twenty combat missions in B-17 bombers.

=== Top 40 format ===
Ed Prendergast subsequently managed and then purchased the station. He moved it to a Top 40 format, popular with the young people of Lake Charles.

During the 1970s, KAOK was a competitive and high-profile radio station within the Lake Charles market. It featured remote live broadcasts from many of the station's advertisers. Disc jockeys from KAOK hosted sock hops and youth dances. Mobile DJ pioneers included Dave "The Mouse" Petrik, who was also the station's chief engineer. The station was also heard on one of the local cable channels' audio track during this period.

One memorable KAOK promotion was the "Boogie Bash", a dance featuring KAOK radio DJ Dave the Mouse as well as the other stations personalities, Bill Conway, Steve Golden, and Ken Rice. During the summer of 1973, a series of these dances provided some youthful night life, melding well with the station's Top 40 appeal. At its peak, the station featured personalities such as Jay Michaels, Terry Broussard and Bubba Lutcher. It carried "The Fondel Funeral Home Show," airing on Sunday mornings.

=== Talk format ===
As music listening moved to the FM dial, the station struggled. It began airing an adult contemporary format with an increasing number of talk shows. It eventually evolved into a talk format with Ed Prendergast as the morning host. Ultimately, the station changed hands several times, including ownership by Sidney Simien, known as "Rockin' Sidney," a Zydeco musician who recorded the hit "Don't Mess with My Toot Toot".

A local physician, Marc Pittman, had assisted Ed Prendergast with the transition to a full time talk format in the late 1980s, and also helped with the sale of the station to Rockin' Sidney. In 1997, when Sidney's health was failing from cancer, Simien asked Dr. Pittman to assist in an unsuccessful attempt to sell the station. When no one would meet Rockin' Sidney's price for the sale, Dr. Pittman created Pittman Broadcasting Services, LLC and applied to the Federal Communications Commission to purchase the station at the requested price. The FCC finally granted the application just days before Rockin' Sidney Simien died.

=== Adding an FM station ===
Pittman Broadcasting continued with the talk format, and established KQLK 97.9 FM for Lake Charles' FM radio market. At 3 a.m., Sunday, February 11, 2001, the day before KQLK was to debut, Pittman Broadcasting was hit with a massive electrical power surge. The studios were heavily damaged, with equipment destroyed reportedly in less than eight minutes. Utilizing an internet signal and the new KQLK tower in Longville, KAOK was back on the air as a simulcast within 24 hours of the disaster. This would not have been possible without the assistance from local independent broadcasters and engineers, as well as the efforts of the Pittman Broadcasting staff.

Both 1400 KAOK and KQLK 97.9 FM were sold to Cumulus Media in 2004. With Cumulus taking over the programming, several conservative talk shows from co-owned Westwood One were added to KAOK's schedule.

== Programming ==
KAOK carries Moon Griffon's morning show from KPEL-FM in Lafayette; the remainder of the station's program lineup is syndicated.
