= XHUHV-FM =

Radio station in Chicontepec de Tejeda, Veracruz

- Chicontepec de Tejeda, Veracruz; Mexico
- Frequency: 97.9 MHz
- Branding: Radio CEU

Programming
- Format: University radio

Ownership
- Owner: Universidad Huasteca Veracruzana, S.C.

History
- First air date: May 2015 (concession)
- Call sign meaning: Universidad Huasteca Veracruzana

Technical information
- Licensing authority: CRT
- Class: B1
- ERP: 1 kW
- HAAT: 317.5 m
- Transmitter coordinates: 20°58′22″N 98°10′51″W

Links
- Website: www.radioceu.com/page/index.html

XHUHV-FM is a radio station serving Chicontepec de Tejeda, Veracruz owned by the Universidad Huasteca Veracruzana. It is branded as Radio CEU (for Comunidades Educativas Unidas) and broadcasts on 97.9 FM.

It received its social use concession in May 2015 and was among the first stations to ever receive such a concession. The station had been operating prior to then without a concession.
