= Louis R. Douglass =

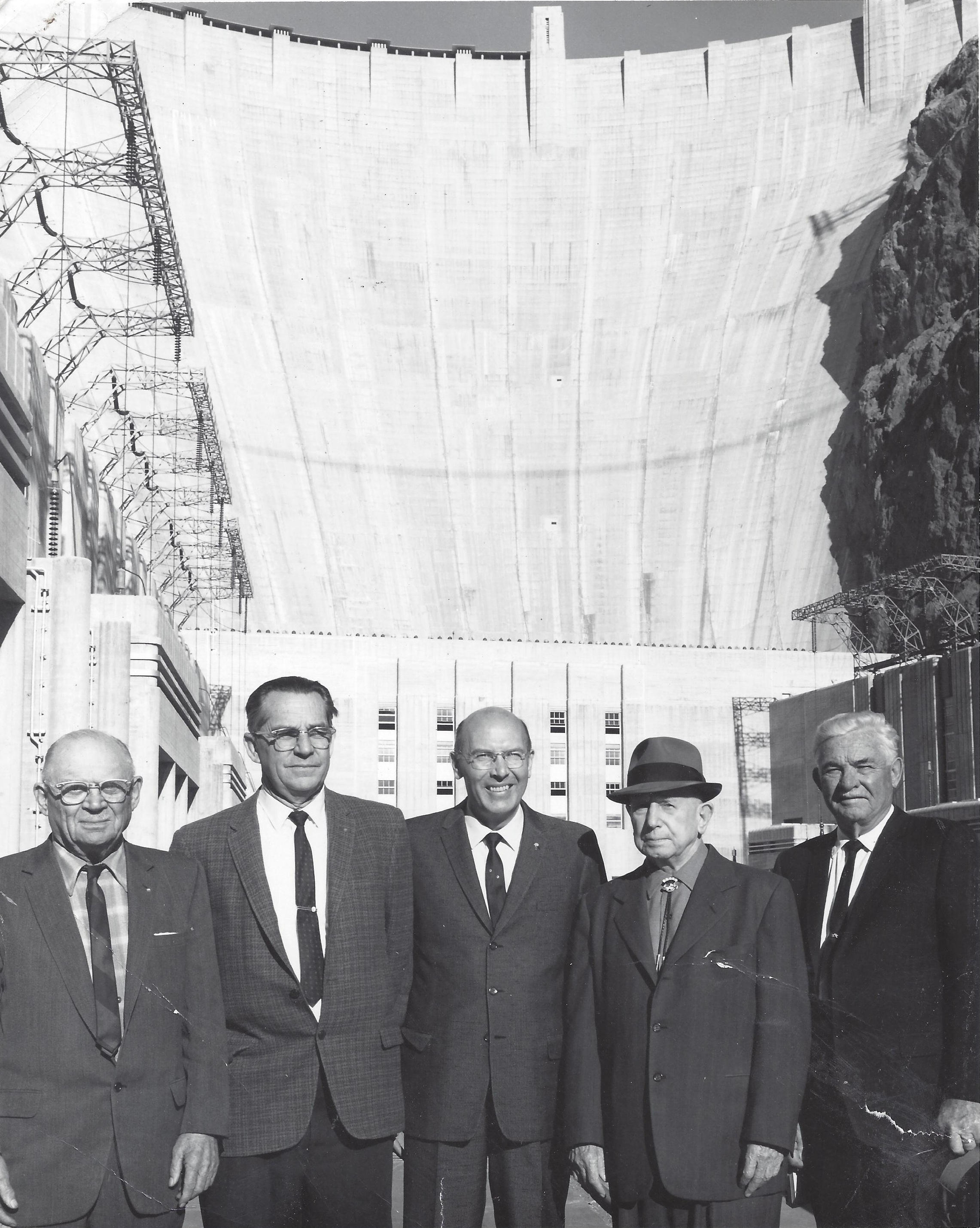
- Bureau of Reclamation officials at Hoover Dam (Douglass at far left) c. 1962.
- Born: March 2, 1888; Gallup, New Mexico
- Died: January 13, 1979 (aged 90); Boulder City, Nevada
- Occupation: Civil engineer
- Known for: Hoover Dam and Davis Dam

Louis Rea "Doug" Douglass (March 2, 1888 – January 13, 1979) was an American civil engineer. He spent more than 20 years with the United States Bureau of Reclamation and was in charge of Hoover Dam and the surrounding park land for four years.

From 1933 to 1954, Douglass worked for the Bureau of Reclamation. He prepared construction drawings for Hoover Dam and other aspects of the Boulder Canyon Project. During the mid-1940s, he was an Assistant Regional Director with responsibility for the Davis Dam 67 miles downstream from Hoover Dam. In 1949, he was sent to Japan where he prepared a study and recommendations for the design and construction of dams and irrigation works. From 1950 to 1954, he served as the Director of Power at Hoover Dam, overseeing the installation of three new generating units, including the first to have a solid stainless steel turbine runner.

Douglass also served in the United States Army Quartermaster Corps during World War I, with responsibility for the construction of Army hospitals at Leon Springs, Texas, as well as U.S. Army General Hospital No. 7 in Baltimore, Maryland, and at Henry Ford Hospital in Detroit, Michigan. He also served three years as the City Engineer in Henderson, Nevada, in the 1950s, and was the Chairman of the Colorado River Advisory Board.

== Early years ==
Douglass was born in 1888 in The Territory of The Indian Nations at what later became Gallup, New Mexico. Douglass was reportedly "proud of his pioneer heritage" and frequently spoke about "the frontier skills" he learned as a boy. Douglass attended the University of Colorado at Boulder where he received B.S.C.E. and M.S. degrees in civil engineering.

== Engineering career ==
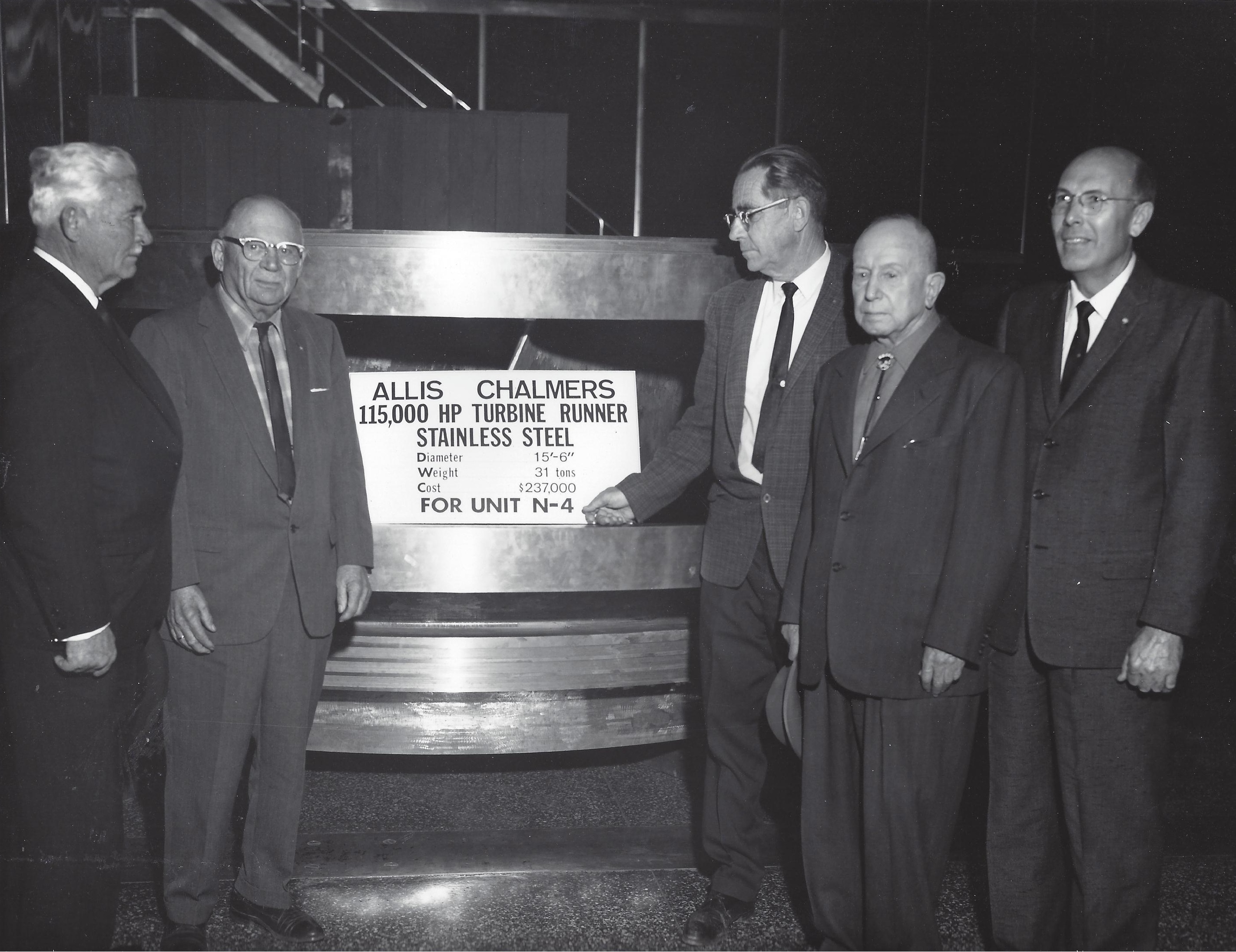
Douglass (second from left) with stainless steel turbine runner at Hoover Dam.

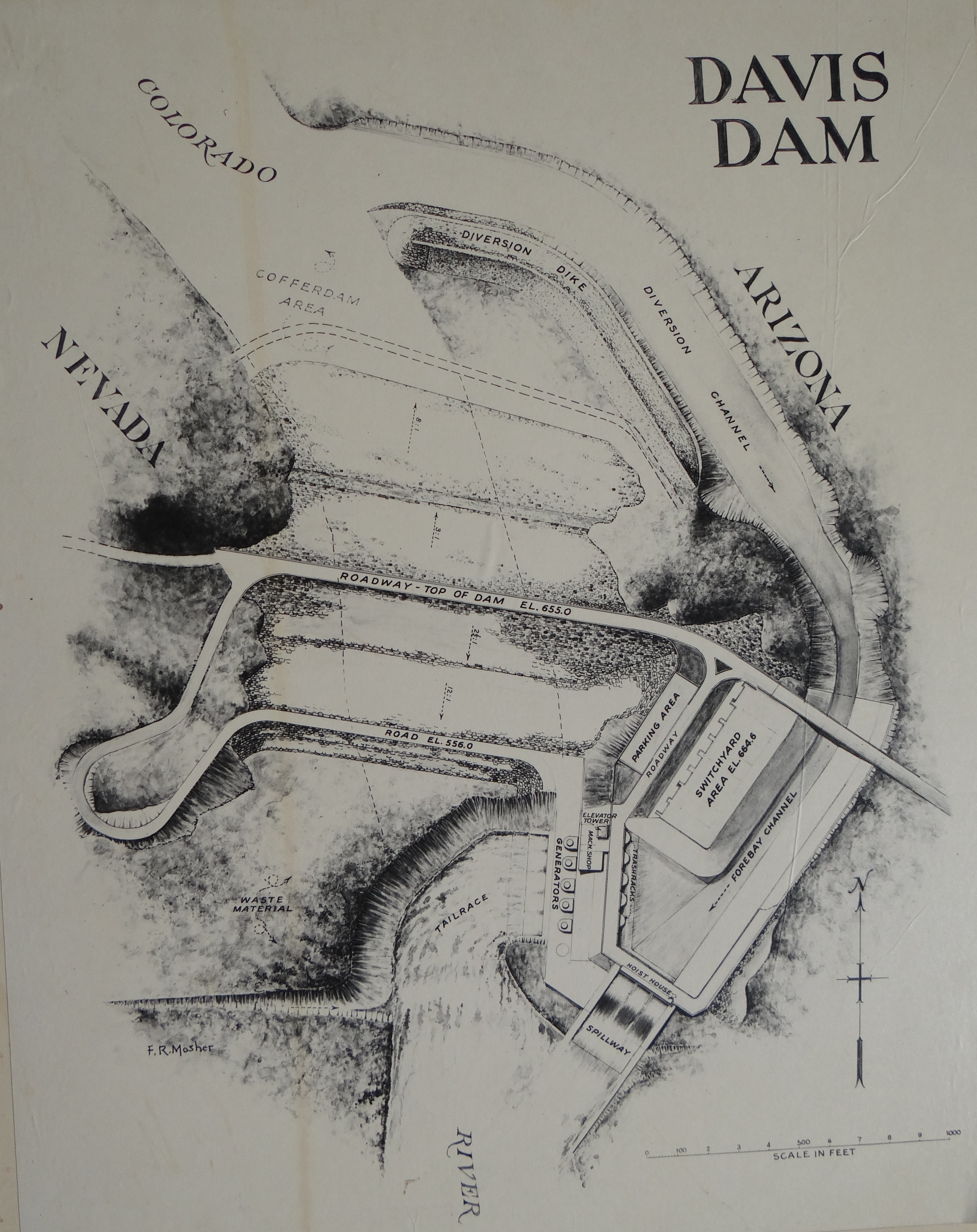
Engineering drawings for Davis Dam

Douglass began his engineering career in 1909 with the Danford & Sanderson firm in Trinidad and Walsenburg, Colorado. He became a junior member of that firm.

On May 17, 1917, shortly after the United States entered World War I, Douglass enlisted in the United States Army. He served as a captain in the Quartermaster Corps's construction division. He was initially charged with responsibility for sewers, sewage disposal and cantonments at Leon Springs, Texas (near San Antonio). He was next put in charge of the construction of Army hospitals at Leon Springs as well as U.S. Army General Hospital No. 7 at Roland Park, Baltimore, Maryland and Henry Ford Hospital in Detroit, Michigan. He received his discharge from the Army in June 1919.

After World War I, Douglass moved to Dearborn, Michigan where he worked as an engineer with a subsidiary of the Ford Motor Company. He later formed, and served as president of, the firm of Douglass, Corey and Fish Engineers with offices in Denver, Trinidad, and Walsenburg, Colorado.

In 1933, Douglass was hired as a design engineer by the Denver office of the United States Bureau of Reclamation, he was assigned to the civil engineering office. When he joined the Bureau, construction of the Hoover Dam was underway, and he was assigned to preparation of construction drawings for the Boulder Canyon (Hoover Dam) Project. He spent more than 20 years with the Bureau of Reclamation until his retirement in 1954. Douglass was eventually placed in charge of Hoover Dam and the surrounding park land from 1950 to 1954.

Among Douglass's other works, he designed the roof for the Bureau of Reclamation's power house at the hydroelectric project near Boulder City, Nevada. The roof was "engineered to withstand the force of boulders that might fall from the rock walls near the dam." In 1939, he published a paper entitled, "Accident Occurrence and Control on Heavy Construction of the Bureau of Reclamation."

In February 1944, Douglass was assigned to Washington, D.C., as Engineering Assistant to the Commissioner of the U.S. Bureau of Reclamation. A former colleague later recalled Douglass's brief stint in Washington as follows:

"Lou Douglass was the representative of the Commissioner of Reclamation at the meetings of the Tripartite Agreement, but he decided early on after just a few months that the Washington maelstrom was not his cup of tea. He liked to know what he was going to do today, tomorrow, and next week. But that hectic activity in Washington, you never knew what you were going to do in the next fifteen minutes. So he saw an opportunity to transfer as an Assistant Regional Director at Region III to Boulder City."

In October 1944, he was assigned to Boulder City, Nevada as Assistant Regional Director of the Bureau's newly formed Region III. During this time, Douglass was responsible for "a major part of the administrative and engineering responsibility" for the Davis Dam project being built 67 miles downstream from Hoover Dam. He was considered "an authority on the Davis Dam and park land."

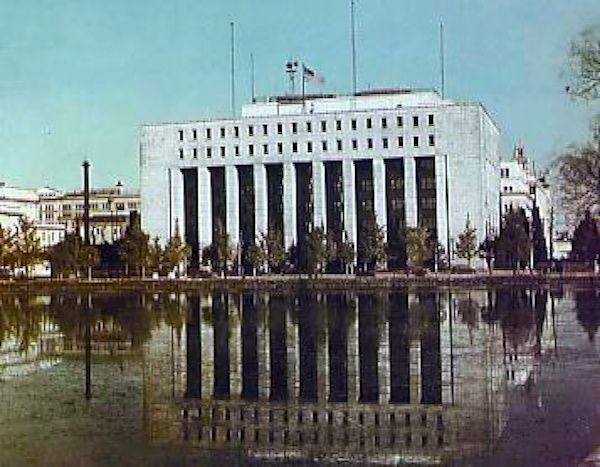
SCAP headquarters in Tokyo, c. 1950

At the end of 1948, Douglass was sent to Japan as a consultant to the natural resources section of the general headquarters of the Supreme Commander for the Allied Powers in Japan under Gen. Douglas MacArthur. He prepared a study and recommendations for the design and construction of dams and irrigation works in Japan. He was awarded a citation for outstanding service by the G.H.Q. for his work in Japan.

In 1950, Douglass became the Director of Power at Hoover Dam. In that capacity, he supervised the installation of three new generating units (A-3, A-4, and A-9) at the Arizona wing of the power plant. The A-9 unit was noted for being the first at Hoover Dam to have a solid stainless steel turbine runner. Douglass retired from the Bureau in 1954. At the time of his retirement, Douglass received the United States Department of the Interior Distinguished Service Citation and Gold Medal "for outstanding contributions in the field of water conservation and control."

After retiring from the Bureau, Douglass served three years as the City Engineer in Henderson, Nevada. He was also the Chairman of the Colorado River Advisory Board.

== Family, community service and later years ==
He was married to Amelia Fredericka Hindman. They had a son, Frederick, and a daughter, Florence Elizabeth. His first wife died in childbirth in 1919. Douglass was later married to Norma Douglass in August 1922 at Trinidad, Colorado. He was a member of the Masonic Order, Rotary International, the American Legion, the American Society of Civil Engineers, Sigma Nu, the Teknik Club of Denver, and Chi Epsilon. He was a past president of the local Rotary Club and of the Boulder City Shrine Club. He was also the District Chairman of the Boulder Dam Area Council of the Boy Scouts of America, the president of the Board of Boulder City Hospital for six years, and a member of the Boulder City School Board in the 1950s.

Douglass was a member of St. Christopher's Episcopal Church in Boulder City and served as a Junior Warden from 1955 to 1960. In his retirement, he built a mahogany pulpit, lectern, prayer desk, and baptismal font for the church.

Douglass was also a popular speaker in the Boulder City area, known as "a raconteur" who, "[a]t the drop of a hat ... could come up with a story for just about any occasion."

In his later years, Douglass and his wife resided at the Boulder City Care Center. He died in Boulder City in 1979 at age 90. He was buried at Trinidad, Colorado.
