= DXCF =

Spring Radio (DXCF)
Tampakan; Philippines
- Broadcast area: Northern South Cotabato and surrounding areas
- Frequency: 97.9 MHz
- Branding: 97.9 Spring Radio

Programming
- Languages: Hiligaynon, Filipino
- Format: Contemporary MOR, OPM, Community radio

Ownership
- Owner: Tampakan Municipal Government

History
- First air date: 2010
- Former frequencies: 100.9 MHz (2010–2013)

Technical information
- Licensing authority: NTC
- Power: 3,000 watts
- ERP: 5,000 watts

DXCF (97.9 FM), broadcasting as 97.9 Spring Radio, is a radio station owned and operated by the Government of Tampakan. Its studios and transmitter are located at the 2nd Floor, Fitz Bldg., Brgy. Poblacion, Tampakan.

It was formerly owned by Manila Broadcasting Company under the Radyo Natin Network from 2010 to 2012, when the Government of Tampakan took over the station's operations and rebranded it as Spring Radio. In January 2013, it moved from 100.9 FM to 97.9 FM to make way for HI FM based from Matalam.
