= KKGB =

- Sulphur, Louisiana; United States
- Broadcast area: Lake Charles, Louisiana
- Frequency: 101.3 MHz
- Branding: Rock 101

Programming
- Format: Classic rock
- Affiliations: Westwood One

Ownership
- Owner: Cumulus Media; (Cumulus Licensing LLC)
- Sister stations: KAOK, KBIU, KQLK, KYKZ

History
- First air date: December 7, 1977 (as KTQQ at 100.9)
- Former call signs: KTQQ (1977–1994)
- Former frequencies: 100.9 MHz (1977–1994)

Technical information
- Licensing authority: FCC
- Facility ID: 106
- Class: C3
- ERP: 12,000 watts
- HAAT: 146 meters (479 ft)
- Transmitter coordinates: 30°14′41.0″N 93°20′37.0″W

Links
- Public license information: Public file; LMS
- Webcast: Listen Live
- Website: kkgb.com

KKGB (101.3 FM) is a classic rock formatted broadcast radio station licensed to Sulphur, Louisiana, serving Southwest Louisiana. KKGB is owned and operated by Cumulus Media. Its studios are located on Broad Street in downtown Lake Charles and its transmitter is in Sulphur, Louisiana.

== History ==
The station signed on the air in 1977 with the callsign KTQQ, and branded as "Q101 - The Country Boss" and was a fierce competitor against country station KYKZ 96 throughout the 1980s. It was originally located at frequency 100.9 MHz. KTQQ eventually succumbed to country station Kicks 96 in popularity by the 1990s; the country format was put to an end and the station was later bought as a sister station. Due to pressure by the FCC; the station was forced to move from 100.9 to 101.3 MHz as a Class C3 station in the mid 1990s to avoid ongoing interference with KJAS (now KKHT) located also at 100.9 MHz, and this time with a new callsign change from KTQQ to KKGB.
