= KYKZ =

Country music radio station in Lake Charles, Louisiana

- Lake Charles, Louisiana; United States
- Broadcast area: Southwest Louisiana/Southeast Texas
- Frequency: 96.1 MHz
- Branding: The BIG KIX 96.1

Programming
- Format: Country
- Affiliations: Westwood One

Ownership
- Owner: Cumulus Media; (Cumulus Licensing LLC)
- Sister stations: KAOK, KBIU, KKGB, KQLK

History
- First air date: January 5, 1976 (as KSNS)
- Former call signs: KSNS (1976–1981)
- Call sign meaning: play on the word "Kicks"

Technical information
- Licensing authority: FCC
- Facility ID: 38601
- Class: C1
- ERP: 100,000 watts
- HAAT: 146 meters (479 ft)

Links
- Public license information: Public file; LMS
- Webcast: Listen Live
- Website: kykz.com

KYKZ (96.1 FM) is a country formatted broadcast radio station licensed to Lake Charles, Louisiana, serving Southwestern Louisiana. KYKZ is owned and operated by Cumulus Media. Its studios are located at 425 Broad Street in downtown Lake Charles and its transmitter is located in Sulphur, Louisiana.
