= CINY-FM =

Radio station in Inukjuak, Quebec

Coordinates: 58°27′23″N 78°06′14″W

- Inukjuak, Quebec; Canada
- Frequency: 97.9 MHz

Programming
- Format: First Nations community radio

Ownership
- Owner: Natturaliit Youth Committee

History
- First air date: 1994

Technical information
- ERP: 10 watts
- HAAT: 12.2 metres (40 ft)

CINY-FM is a community radio station that broadcasts on the frequency 97.9 FM in Inukjuak, Quebec, Canada.

Owned by Natturaliit Youth Committee, the station was licensed in 1994.
