= KBIU =

- Lake Charles, Louisiana; United States
- Broadcast area: Lake Charles, Louisiana, Southwest Louisiana
- Frequency: 103.3 MHz
- Branding: Hot 103.3

Programming
- Language: English
- Format: Contemporary hit radio
- Affiliations: Westwood One

Ownership
- Owner: Cumulus Media; (Cumulus Licensing LLC)
- Sister stations: KAOK, KKGB, KQLK, KYKZ

History
- First air date: January 23, 1976; 50 years ago (as KGRA at 103.7)
- Former call signs: KGRA (1976–1981)
- Former frequencies: 103.7 MHz (1976–2005)
- Call sign meaning: Sounds like "Bayou" for former branding

Technical information
- Licensing authority: FCC
- Facility ID: 17019
- Class: C2
- ERP: 35,000 watts
- HAAT: 146 meters (479 ft)
- Transmitter coordinates: 30°14′41″N 93°20′37″W

Links
- Public license information: Public file; LMS
- Webcast: Listen Live
- Website: hot1033.com

KBIU (103.3 MHz, "Hot 103.3") is an American radio station broadcasting a top 40 (CHR) format, licensed to Lake Charles, Louisiana. The station is currently owned by Cumulus Media. Its studios are located on Broad Street in downtown Lake Charles and its transmitter is in Sulphur, Louisiana.

== History ==
The station's original call letters were KGRA and it broadcast under the moniker of "Nova 104" from 1976 to 1981. Nova 104 played a format of AOR (Album Oriented Rock) music with laid back air personalities who each programmed the music for their individual shows from one of the largest vinyl album libraries in Louisiana. The format featured everything from AC/DC to Frank Zappa and included progressive country such as Jerry Jeff Walker and Rusty Wier. Nova 104 also featured a weekend Jazz show which added to their diversity and appeal. The station offered a "hip" alternative to the news that complemented the AOR format by running nationally produced entertaining news bites called News Blimps and locally produced tidbits called Nova Information. The station was also community oriented putting on several concerts over the course of its history to raise money for worthwhile causes including the "Save The Arcade" campaign. Then in 1981 the station switched to a Top 40/CHR format and its call sign to KBIU, under their new moniker as "All Hit Bayou 104". In 2005, the station switched from broadcasting at 103.7 FM to 103.3 FM. It had most recently continued the format although the moniker became "B103 The B". The station was flipped to a Variety hits format under the Jack FM branding in May 2008.

The station was originally located physically on the 6th floor of The Pioneer Building in downtown Lake Charles which is now Lake Charles' City Hall. The station's original frequency was 103.7 and broadcast at 100,000 watts from a 150-meter tower originally allowing for a great area coverage allowing it to also cover the Beaumont, Texas area.

The station was downgraded in power, height, and frequency from 103.7 to 103.3 in 2005 by its current owner Cumulus Media in an attempt to allow for KHJK to be re-aligned as a Houston, Texas rimshot station.

On March 23, 2012 KBIU changed their format to adult contemporary, branded as "Warm 103.3" using Westwood One's Adult Contemporary format.

On January 1, 2016 at Midnight, after extending their Christmas music stint past Christmas, KBIU flipped back to CHR as "Hot 103.3", adopting the old format and branding of KQLK before it changed formats in 2014. The first song on Hot was "679" by Fetty Wap.
