= Rudy's Country Store and Bar-B-Q =

Barbecue restaurant established in Leon Springs in San Antonio, Texas, US

Rudy's Texas Bar-B-Q, LLC
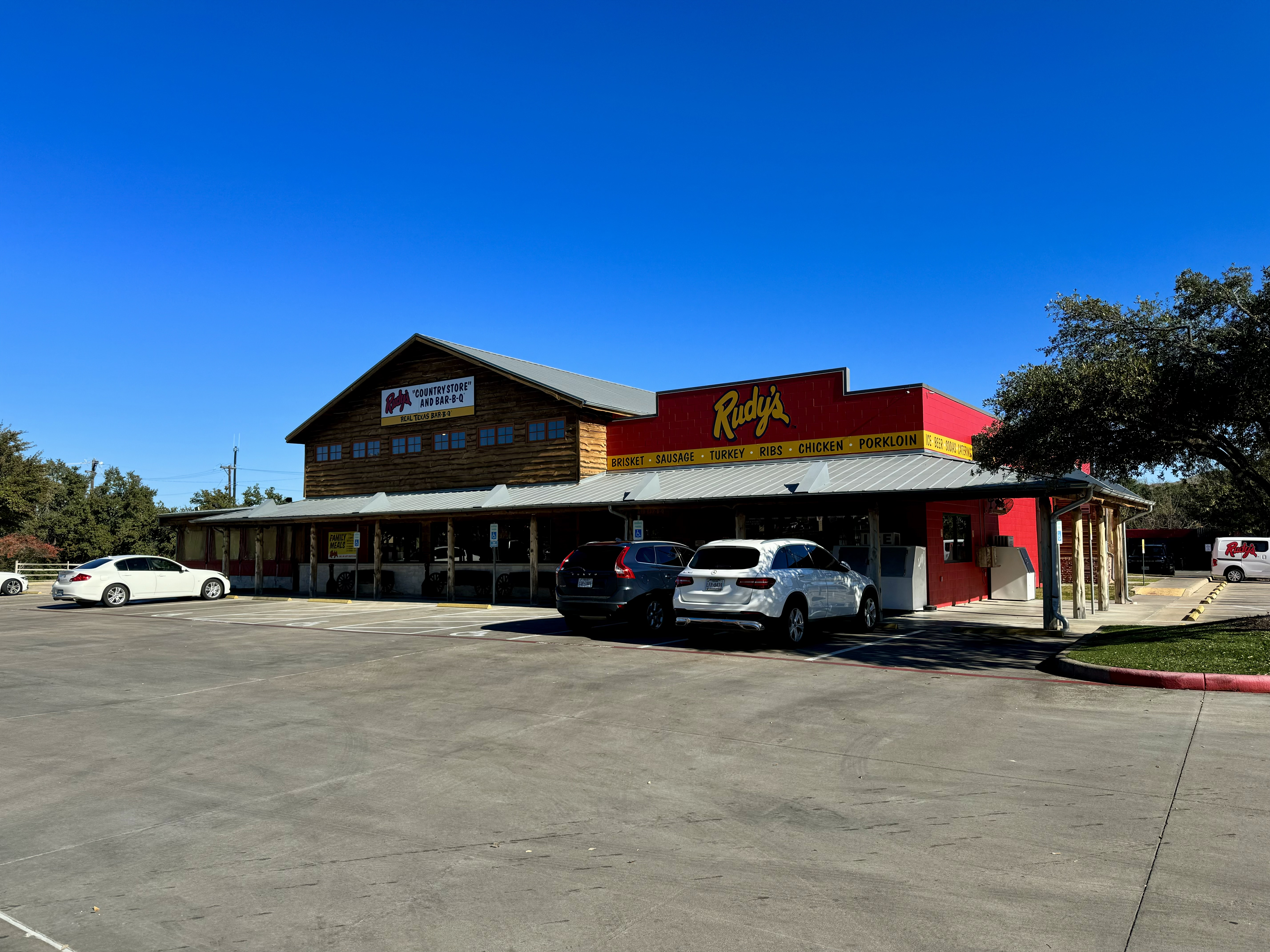
- A Rudy’s in Austin, Texas
- Trade name: Rudy's Country Store and Bar-B-Q
- Type: Privately held
- Founded: 1989; 37 years ago
- Founder: Rudolph Aue, Phil Romano
- Headquarters: 1514 Ranch Road 620 South; Lakeway, Texas 78734
- Number of locations: 50
- Products: Barbecue
- Revenue: US$109.4 million (2024)
- Owner: undisclosed
- Number of employees: 1,000 (2024)
- Website: rudys.com

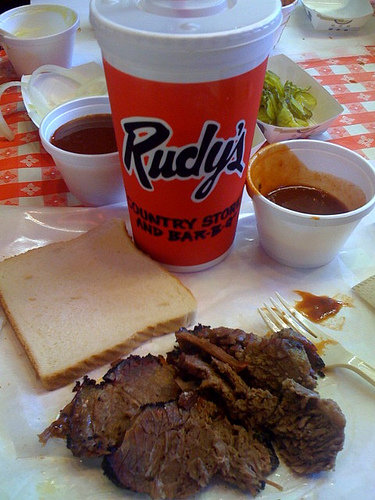
A sampling of Rudy's foods

Rudy's Country Store and Bar-B-Q is a barbecue restaurant established in Leon Springs, a district of San Antonio in the U.S. state of Texas in 1989. The company operates restaurants in Texas, Arkansas, Arizona, Oklahoma, New Mexico, Colorado, and Florida and sells products online.

== History ==
Rudy's was established by Rudolph Aue in Leon Springs, Texas (now a part of San Antonio, Texas) in 1929 as a combination business consisting of a filling station, automobile repair shop, and grocery store. In 1989 Rudolph added barbecue to the food menu, combining the grocery and new restaurant element to make a "country store" feel. Their signature barbecue consists of 100% oak wood smoked meats rather than the usual Texas Mesquite smoke, and special in-house spices.

Rudy's later expanded to 51 locations through the states of Florida, Texas, Oklahoma, Arizona, Colorado, and New Mexico. Now more of a self-service sit down restaurant style establishment, the retail store portion usually consists of a small corner of each location. The company's head offices are currently located in Spicewood, Texas.

== Menu ==
Rudy's perennial best-seller is brisket, with other popular offerings including turkey, chicken, pork ribs, sausage, chopped beef, pulled pork, and prime rib. Sides include coleslaw, cream corn, spicy pinto beans, new potatoes, potato salad and bread. Soda and beer are sold as beverages and both feature regional selections. Rudy's also serves breakfast tacos in the morning, which can be made to order or bought from the "grab-and-go" selection in the country store.

From the official shop, Rudy’s sells a branded line of “Sause” and rubs, including items like Original “Sause,” Sissy “Sause,” and dry rubs.

== Accolades ==
The Daily Meal writes their favorite menu item "is the extra moist brisket". The former governor of California, Arnold Schwarzenegger, dubbed Rudy's in Austin "the best of the best". On May 31, 2017, Daniel Vaughn of Texas Monthly writes "It’s the best statewide barbecue chain in Texas".

== NASCAR sponsorship ==
Rudy's initially jumped in to NASCAR by sponsoring driver Brad Coleman and team Joe Gibbs Racing for three Xfinity Series (then Nationwide) races in 2009, under the name rudys.com The name "Rudy's Country Store & BBQ" was used for the company's re-entry in 2016 with Garrett Smithley and JD Motorsports.
