= CJNC-FM =

Coordinates: 53°59′39″N 97°46′20″W

- Norway House, Manitoba; Canada
- Broadcast area: Norway House Cree Nation
- Frequency: 97.9 MHz

Programming
- Format: First Nations community radio

Ownership
- Owner: Norway House Cree Nation Communications

Technical information
- ERP: 42 watts
- HAAT: 36.5 metres (120 ft)

Links
- Webcast: CJNC-FM
- Website: cjnc97.com

CJNC-FM is a First Nations community radio station that operates at 97.9 FM in Norway House, Manitoba, Canada.

The year the station was given approval to broadcast is currently unknown, it was then-owned by Native Communication Inc. The station is currently owned by Norway House Cree Nation Communications.
