= KCJV-LP =

- Leon Springs, Texas; United States
- Broadcast area: San Antonio, Texas
- Frequency: 97.9 MHz
- Branding: "No Hit Radio"

Programming
- Format: Oldies

Ownership
- Owner: Hispanic Heritage Radio Network

History
- First air date: March 19, 2016
- Former call signs: KCJV-LP (2015–Present)

Technical information
- Licensing authority: FCC
- Facility ID: 196500
- Class: L1
- Power: 15 Watts
- HAAT: 76 meters (249 ft)
- Transmitter coordinates: 29°39′32.20″N 98°38′28.30″W

Links
- Public license information: LMS
- Webcast: Listen live
- Website: KCJV-LP Online

KCJV-LP is an Oldies formatted broadcast radio station licensed to Leon Springs, Texas, serving San Antonio, Texas. KCJV-LP is owned and operated by Hispanic Heritage Radio Network.
