= WRIP =

- Windham, New York; United States
- Broadcast area: Catskills; Capital Region
- Frequency: 97.9 MHz
- Branding: RIP 97.9 FM

Programming
- Format: Adult contemporary
- Affiliations: Premiere Networks; United Stations Radio Networks

Ownership
- Owner: Rip Radio LLC

History
- First air date: August 1999
- Call sign meaning: WRIP for Rip Van Winkle, famed folklore resident of the Catskill Mountains

Technical information
- Licensing authority: FCC
- Facility ID: 83204
- Class: A
- ERP: 580 watts
- HAAT: 322 meters (1,056 ft)
- Transmitter coordinates: 42°17′06.3″N 74°15′54.9″W
- Translators: 97.5 W248BG (Durham); 103.7 W279AL (Catskill); 104.5 W283BP (Stamford)
- Repeater: 97.9 WRIP-FM1 (Hunter)

Links
- Public license information: Public file; LMS
- Webcast: Listen Live
- Website: www.wripfm.com

WRIP (97.9 FM, "RIP 97.9") is an adult contemporary radio station licensed to Windham, New York, serving the northern Catskill Mountains region and the Capital District of New York State. The station is locally owned and operated by Rip Radio LLC. WRIP broadcasts with 580 watts effective radiated power from atop Windham Mountain on Cave Mountain in Windham, 3,085 feet above sea level. A booster station atop nearby Hunter Mountain serves the Hunter, NY-Tannersville area. The station provides music, news, and weather information for residents and travelers in the Great Northern Catskills area, a popular skiing and vacation destination. The station also simulcasts at 97.5 MHz from Durham, New York and is carried on 104.5 MHz serving the greater Stamford, NY area from atop the town's Mount Utsayantha. As of 2015, the station was also heard on 103.7 FM, serving the greater Catskill and Hudson (NY) area.

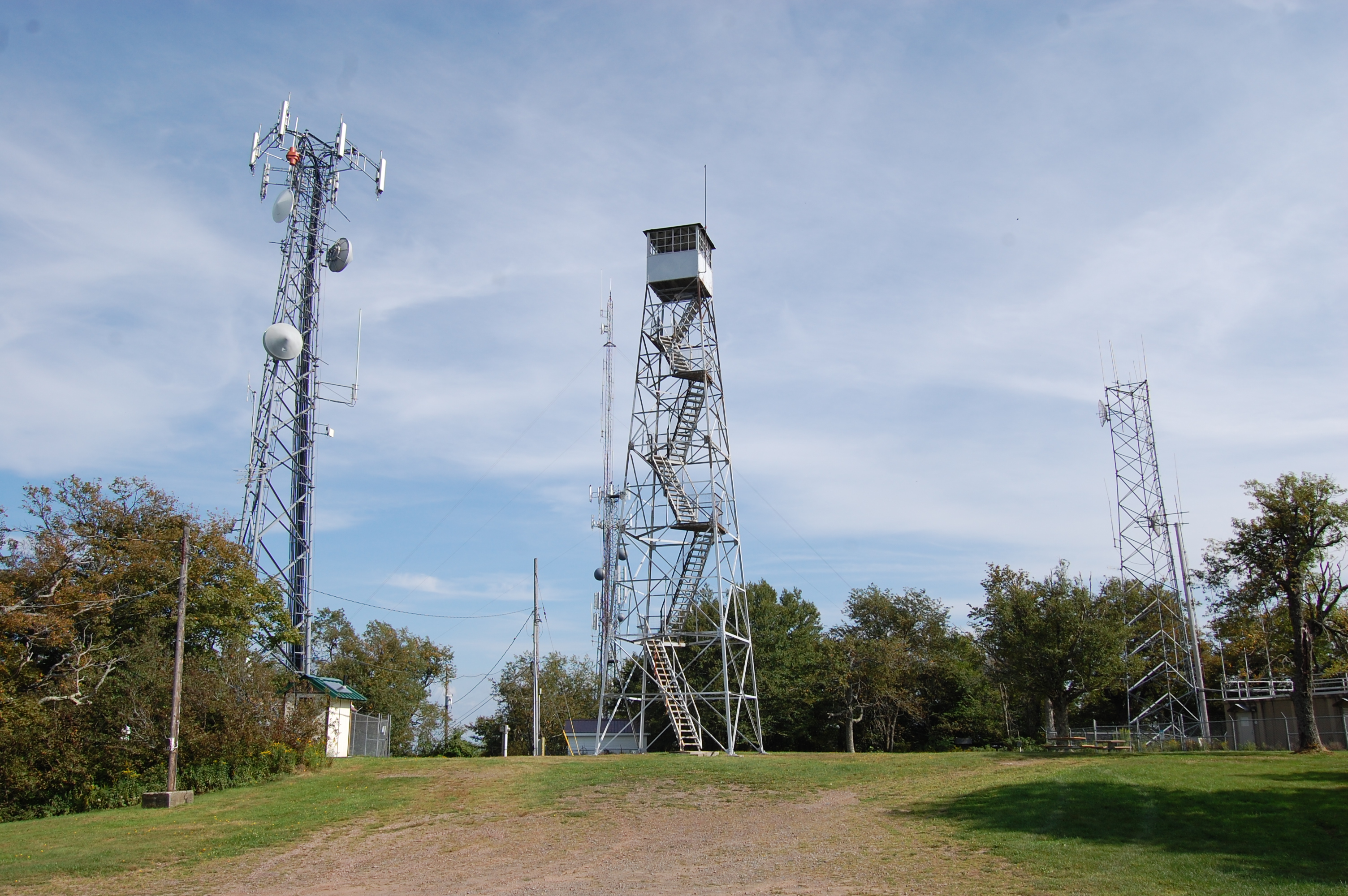
Radio antennas on Mount Utsayantha

WRIP first signed on in August 1999 as the first radio station in Greene County based outside Catskill.

Initially, the station had a uniquely split format of adult contemporary weekdays and oldies weekends.

Now WRIP focuses primarily on AC hits from the 1980s, 1990s and today. Weekday mornings were hosted by station manager Guy Patrick Garraghan until his death in November 2010. Garraghan was a lifelong local resident who spent 17 years on the air at WCKL in Catskill prior to coming to WRIP in 1999. He is credited for being the primary force in bringing local radio to the mountaintop region.

Current Operations Manager Joe Loverro hosts morning drive, while WRIP President and General Manager Jay Fink hosts afternoon drive.

Weekends feature a mix of locally and nationally produced specialty programming such as Joe Loverro's "Friday Night Gold" and "Greatest Hits USA," an oldies show hosted by Chuck Matthews airing Saturday nights.

Sundays feature "Smooth Weekend" - a syndicated Smooth Jazz show hosted by Allen Kepler - and "Sunday Night, Nice 'N' Easy" showcasing easy pop music from the 1940s, 1950s & 1960s - with host Kelly Green.

The station also airs other syndicated specialty programming each week, including a deep cuts 1980s show, a four-hour Classic Hits show, an acoustic rock show, a three-hour show 80s show hosted by original MTV VJ Nina Blackwood and an American Top 40 80s original countdown show with the late Casey Kasem.
