= DWSN =

- Laoag; Philippines
- Broadcast area: Ilocos Norte and surrounding areas
- Frequency: 97.9 MHz

Programming
- Format: Silent

Ownership
- Owner: Southern Broadcasting Network

History
- First air date: 1980
- Last air date: February 25, 2018
- Former names: Mom's Radio (until 2018)
- Call sign meaning: Southern Broadcasting Network

Technical information
- Licensing authority: NTC

DWSN (97.9 FM) was a radio station owned and operated by Southern Broadcasting Network.
