= KCMR =

- Mason City, Iowa; United States
- Frequency: 97.9 MHz
- Branding: Inspiration 97.9

Programming
- Format: Christian

Ownership
- Owner: TLC Broadcasting Corporation

History
- First air date: May 3, 1979
- Former frequencies: 98.3 MHz (1979–1990)

Technical information
- Licensing authority: FCC
- Facility ID: 67199
- Class: A
- ERP: 6,000 watts
- HAAT: 96 meters (315 feet)
- Transmitter coordinates: 43°07′18″N 93°11′50″W

Links
- Public license information: Public file; LMS
- Webcast: Listen live
- Website: www.kcmrfm.com

KCMR (97.9 FM, "Inspiration 97.9") is a Christian radio station in Mason City, Iowa, United States. KCMR is owned by TLC Broadcasting Corporation, a non-profit corporation.

== History ==
KCMR began broadcasting May 3, 1979, at 98.3 MHz. It was founded by the TLC Broadcasting Corporation, a separate entity from but started by the Trinity Lutheran Church. Its primary format was easy listening music interspersed with community announcements and Christian messages. This format was chosen in hopes of reaching a broader audience than might a traditional Christian music or teaching station.

In 2002, KCMR began broadcasting IRIS, Iowa's radio reading service, on its subcarrier. It was the first non-public radio station in the state to provide IRIS service, filling in reception gaps in North Iowa. In addition, volunteers began reading North Iowa-specific information, including the Globe Gazette, at KCMR's studios.
