= KLLG-LP =

- Willits, California; United States
- Frequency: 97.9 MHz

Programming
- Format: Community radio

Ownership
- Owner: Little Lake Grange #670

History
- First air date: May 23, 2014

Technical information
- Licensing authority: FCC
- Facility ID: 197092
- Class: L1
- ERP: 100 watts
- HAAT: −28.4 meters (−93 ft)
- Transmitter coordinates: 39°24′35.69″N 123°21′16.84″W

Links
- Public license information: LMS
- Website: kllg.org

KLLG-LP is a low power radio station broadcasting a community radio format out of Willits, California, in Mendocino County. The station is an affiliate of the syndicated Pink Floyd program "Floydian Slip."

== History ==
KLLG-LP began broadcasting on May 23, 2014. It is operated out of the Little Lake Grange building, by volunteers.
