= KMAI-LP =

- Alturas, California; United States
- Frequency: 97.9 MHz

Programming
- Format: Defunct (was Highway advisory radio)

Ownership
- Owner: State of California

Technical information
- Licensing authority: FCC
- Facility ID: 124325
- Class: L1
- ERP: 100 watts
- HAAT: −78 meters (−256 ft)
- Transmitter coordinates: 41°29′51″N 120°32′19″W

Links
- Public license information: LMS

KMAI-LP (97.9 FM) was a low-power radio station licensed to Alturas, California, United States. The station broadcast highway information.
