= WXEF =

Coordinates: 39°07′25″N 88°38′28″W

- Effingham, Illinois; United States
- Frequency: 97.9 MHz D
- Branding: 97.9 XFM

Programming
- Format: Classic hits
- Affiliations: Premiere Networks

Ownership
- Owner: Premier Broadcasting, Inc.

History
- First air date: 1982 (as WBFG)
- Former call signs: WBFG (1982–1993)

Technical information
- Licensing authority: FCC
- Facility ID: 53399
- Class: A
- ERP: 6,000 watts
- HAAT: 95 meters

Links
- Public license information: Public file; LMS
- Webcast: Listen Live
- Website: thexradio.com

WXEF 97.9 FM is a radio station broadcasting a classic hits format. Licensed to Effingham, Illinois, the station is owned by Premier Broadcasting, Inc.
