= WLHR-LP =

- Maryville, Tennessee; United States
- Frequency: 97.9 MHz

Ownership
- Owner: East Maryville Baptist Church

History
- Former call signs: WWOP-LP (2003–2004)
- Former frequencies: 105.9 MHz (2003–2013)

Technical information
- Licensing authority: FCC
- Facility ID: 133983
- Class: L1
- ERP: 63 watts
- HAAT: 37.7 meters (124 ft)
- Transmitter coordinates: 35°46′30.00″N 83°56′14.00″W

Links
- Public license information: LMS

WLHR-LP (97.9 FM) is a low-power radio station licensed to Maryville, Tennessee, United States. The station is currently owned by East Maryville Baptist Church.
