= KQLK =

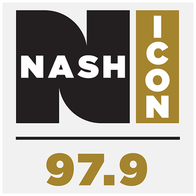
- DeRidder, Louisiana; United States
- Broadcast area: Lake Charles, Louisiana
- Frequency: 97.9 MHz
- Branding: 97.9 Nash Icon

Programming
- Format: Classic country

Ownership
- Owner: Cumulus Media; (Cumulus Licensing LLC)
- Sister stations: KAOK, KBIU, KKGB, KYKZ

History
- First air date: 1965
- Former call signs: KDLA-FM (1965–1975); KEAZ (1975–2000); KAOK-FM (2000–2003)
- Call sign meaning: Q Lake Charles

Technical information
- Licensing authority: FCC
- Facility ID: 9029
- Class: C2
- ERP: 50,000 watts
- HAAT: 150 meters (490 ft)
- Transmitter coordinates: 30°36′57.0″N 93°13′31.0″W

Links
- Public license information: Public file; LMS
- Webcast: Listen Live
- Website: 979nashicon.com

KQLK (97.9 FM) is a classic country formatted broadcast radio station licensed to DeRidder, Louisiana, serving Southwest Louisiana. KQLK is owned and operated by Cumulus Media. Its studios are located on Broad Street in downtown Lake Charles and its transmitter is north of Ragley, Louisiana.

== History ==
In September 1991, what was originally KQLK 97.9 was located at 101.7 MHz and with the call sign KEAZ. It was an oldies station until flipping to country music in 1994. It served primarily the De Ridder, Fort Polk and Leesville market and was owned by DeRidder FM Broadcasting, Inc. The signal was very fringe and almost inaccessible to the Lake Charles and Southwest Louisiana market. In 2000, Pittman Broadcasting, LLC bought the station and later flipped the station to an FM simulcast of KAOK-AM, a news and talk station in nearby Lake Charles; this time with a new frequency change from 101.7 to 97.9 and a relocated transmitter from Vernon to Beauregard Parish. In 2003, the station switched back to country music as "98 Country", and switched its call sign to the current KQLK. The result was moderate to below average ratings. In late 2004, the station was bought by Cumulus Media and would change to Hot 97–9; featuring a CHR format with a predominantly hip hop slant. On August 15, 2014, the station switched to country for the third time as one of the first affiliates of Cumulus' Nash Icon network. As of 2017, the station serves the Lake Charles and Southwest Louisiana market but is still licensed to its hometown of De Ridder.
