= KTMN =

- Cloudcroft, New Mexico; United States
- Frequency: 97.9 MHz
- Branding: Rock 97-9

Programming
- Format: Classic rock

Ownership
- Owner: Cloudcroft Broadcasting Corporation

History
- First air date: 2016

Technical information
- Licensing authority: FCC
- Facility ID: 191499
- Class: C1
- ERP: 9,800 watts
- HAAT: 401 metres (1,316 ft)
- Transmitter coordinates: 32°59′39″N 105°42′29″W
- Translator: 97.5 K248CB (Alamogordo)

Links
- Public license information: Public file; LMS
- Webcast: Listen Live
- Website: Official Website

KTMN (97.9 FM) is a radio station licensed to serve the community of Cloudcroft, New Mexico. The station is owned by Cloudcroft Broadcasting Corporation. It airs a classic rock format.

The station was assigned the KTMN call letters by the Federal Communications Commission on September 17, 2014.
