= KYYR-LP =

- Yakima, Washington; United States
- Frequency: 97.9 MHz
- Branding: The Bridge of Hope FM 97.9

Ownership
- Owner: Calvary Chapel Yakima

Technical information
- Licensing authority: FCC
- Facility ID: 135089
- Class: L1
- ERP: 100 watts
- HAAT: 9.0 meters (29.5 ft)
- Transmitter coordinates: 46°36′23.00″N 120°33′35.00″W

Links
- Public license information: LMS
- Webcast: Listen Live
- Website: calvaryyakima.com

KYYR-LP (97.9 FM, "The Bridge of Hope FM 97.9") is a radio station licensed to Yakima, Washington, United States. The station is currently owned by Calvary Chapel Yakima.
