= List of armored and cavalry regiments of the United States Army =

This list includes armored and cavalry regiments of the United States Army. Former armored cavalry regiments are listed separately.

== 1 to 100 ==
- 1st Cavalry Regiment
  - 1st Squadron is the cavalry squadron assigned to the 2nd Armored BCT, 1st Armored Division stationed at Fort Bliss, Texas.
  - 2nd Squadron is the cavalry squadron assigned to the 1st Stryker BCT, 4th Infantry Division stationed at Fort Carson, Colorado.
  - 5th Squadron is the cavalry squadron assigned to the 1st Stryker BCT, 25th Infantry Division, stationed at Fort Wainwright, Alaska.
  - 6th Squadron is the cavalry squadron assigned to the 1st Armored Brigade Combat Team, 1st Armored Division, stationed at Fort Bliss, Texas.
  - 8th Squadron is the cavalry squadron assigned to the 2nd Stryker BCT, 2nd Infantry Division, stationed at Joint Base Lewis-McChord, Washington. In July 2016, 8th Squadron - 1st Cavalry Regiment participated in Hanuman Guardian 2016, a Joint US-Thai training exercise held in Fort Adisorn, Thailand.
- 2nd Cavalry Regiment - stationed in Germany, as 2nd Stryker Cavalry Regiment
- 3rd Cavalry Regiment - stationed at Fort Hood, Texas, as 3rd Stryker Cavalry Regiment
- 4th Cavalry Regiment
  - 1st Squadron is the cavalry squadron assigned to the 1st Armored BCT, 1st Infantry Division stationed at Fort Riley, Kansas.
  - 3rd Squadron is the cavalry squadron assigned to the 3rd Infantry BCT, 25th Infantry Division stationed at Schofield Barracks, Hawaii.
  - 5th Squadron is the cavalry squadron assigned to the 2nd Armored BCT, 1st Infantry Division stationed at Fort Riley, Kansas.
- 5th Cavalry Regiment
  - 1st Battalion is a combined arms battalion assigned to the 2nd Armored BCT, 1st Cavalry Division, stationed at Fort Hood, Texas.
  - 2nd Battalion is a combined arms battalion assigned to the 1st Armored BCT, 1st Cavalry Division, stationed at Fort Hood, Texas.
- 6th Cavalry Regiment
- 7th Cavalry Regiment
  - 1st Squadron is the cavalry squadron assigned to the 1st Armored BCT, 1st Cavalry Division, stationed at Fort Hood, Texas.
  - 2nd Battalion is a combined arms battalion assigned to the 3rd Armored BCT, 1st Cavalry Division, stationed at Fort Hood, Texas.
  - 5th Squadron is the cavalry squadron assigned to the 1st Armored BCT, 3rd Infantry Division. Was at Fort Benning; now circa December 2021 stationed at Fort Stewart, Georgia.
- 8th Cavalry Regiment
  - 1st Battalion is a combined arms battalion assigned to the 2nd Armored BCT, 1st Cavalry Division, stationed at Fort Hood, Texas.
  - 2nd Battalion is a combined arms battalion assigned to the 1st Armored BCT, 1st Cavalry Division, stationed at Fort Hood, Texas.
  - 3rd Battalion is a combined arms battalion assigned to the 3rd Armored Brigade Combat Team, 1st Cavalry Division, stationed at Fort Hood, Texas.
  - 6th Squadron is the cavalry squadron assigned to the 2nd Armored BCT, 3rd Infantry Division, stationed at Fort Stewart, Georgia.
- 9th Cavalry Regiment
  - 1st Battalion is a combined arms battalion assigned to the 2nd Armored BCT, 1st Cavalry Division, stationed at Fort Hood, Texas.
  - 4th Squadron is the cavalry squadron assigned to the 2nd Armored BCT, 1st Cavalry Division, stationed at Fort Hood, Texas.
  - 6th Squadron is the cavalry squadron assigned to the 3rd Armored Brigade Combat Team, 1st Cavalry Division, stationed at Fort Hood, Texas.
- 10th Cavalry Regiment
  - 4th Squadron is the cavalry squadron assigned to the 3rd Armored BCT, 4th Infantry Division, stationed at Fort Carson, Colorado.
- 11th Armored Cavalry Regiment is the opposing forces unit at the National Training Center, stationed at Fort Irwin, California
- 12th Cavalry Regiment
  - 1st Battalion is a combined arms battalion assigned to the 3rd Armored BCT, 1st Cavalry Division, stationed at Fort Hood, Texas.
  - 2nd Battalion is a combined arms battalion assigned to the 1st Armored BCT, 1st Cavalry Division, stationed at Fort Hood, Texas.
- 13th Cavalry
  - 2nd Squadron is the cavalry squadron assigned to the 3rd Armored BCT, 1st Armored Division, stationed at Fort Bliss, Texas.
- 14th Cavalry
  - 1st Squadron was the cavalry squadron assigned to the 1st Stryker BCT, 2nd Infantry Division, stationed at Joint Base Lewis-McChord, Washington. Now inactivated.
  - 2nd Squadron was the cavalry squadron assigned to the 2nd Infantry BCT, 25th Infantry Division, stationed at Schofield Barracks, Hawaii. Now inactivated.
- 15th Cavalry
  - 5th Squadron conducts MOS 19D Cavalry Scout One Station Unit Training, assigned to the 194th Armored Brigade at Fort Benning, Georgia
- 16th Cavalry Regiment
  - 1st Squadron is a training unit assigned to the 316th Cavalry Brigade, stationed at Fort Benning, Georgia
  - 3rd Squadron is a training unit assigned to the 316th Cavalry Brigade, stationed at Fort Benning, Georgia
- 17th Cavalry Regiment
- 18th Cavalry Regiment
- 19th Cavalry Regiment
- 20th Armor (now 133rd Engineer Battalion in the Maine Army National Guard)
- 26th Cavalry Regiment (United States, 1922–1946), Philippine Scouts
- 26th Cavalry Regiment (United States, 1963–1988)
- 27th Cavalry Regiment
- 28th Cavalry Regiment
- 32nd Cavalry Regiment
  - 1st Squadron is the cavalry squadron assigned to the 1st Infantry BCT, 101st Airborne Division, stationed at Ft Campbell, Kentucky
- 33rd Cavalry Regiment
- 1st Squadron is the cavalry squadron assigned to the 3rd Infantry BCT, 101st Airborne Division, stationed at Ft Campbell, Kentucky
- 34th Armor
  - 2nd Battalion is a combined arms battalion assigned to the 1st Armored BCT, 1st Infantry Division, stationed at Fort Riley, Kansas
- 35th Armor
  - 1st Battalion is a combined arms battalion assigned to the 2nd Armored BCT, 1st Armored Division, stationed at Fort Bliss, Texas
- 37th Armor
  - 1st Battalion is a combined arms battalion assigned to the 2nd Armored BCT, 1st Armored Division, stationed at Fort Bliss, Texas.
  - 2nd Battalion is a combined arms battalion assigned to the 1st Armored Brigade Combat Team, 1st Armored Division, stationed at Fort Bliss, Texas.
- 40th Cavalry Regiment - 40th Armor Regiment was an armored regiment of the United States Army from 1941 until 1997. It was redesignated and reactivated in 2005 as the 40th Cavalry Regiment serving in the 4th Brigade Combat Team (Airborne), 25th Infantry Division.
  - 1st Squadron is the cavalry squadron assigned to the 2nd Infantry Brigade Combat Team (Airborne), 11th Airborne Division
- 43rd Cavalry Regiment – Constituted 1967 and organized 1968 as a CARS parent regiment in the Rhode Island National Guard. It consisted of Troop E, which was reflagged in 1971.
- 53rd Armor – New Jersey Army National Guard parent regiment, elements active 1959–1964
  - 1st Medium Tank Battalion – Redesignated from 252nd Tank Battalion 1959, inactivated and absorbed into 3rd Squadron, 104th Armored Cavalry 1964
  - 2nd Medium Tank Battalion – Redesignated from 250th Tank Battalion 1959, became 6th Battalion, 50th Armor 1964
- 61st Cavalry Regiment
  - 3rd Squadron is the cavalry squadron assigned to the 2nd Infantry BCT, 4th Infantry Division
- 63rd Armor Regiment
- 64th Armor "We Pierce"
  - 1st Battalion is a combined arms battalion assigned to the 1st Armored BCT, 3rd Infantry Division, stationed at Fort Stewart, Georgia
- 66th Armor"Semper in Hostes"
  - 1st Battalion is a combined arms battalion assigned to the 3rd Armored BCT, 4th Infantry Division, stationed at Fort Carson, Colorado
  - 3rd Battalion is a combined arms battalion assigned to the 1st Armored BCT, 1st Infantry Division stationed at Fort Riley, Kansas
- 67th Armor /(formerly 67th Infantry)
  - 1st Battalion is a combined arms battalion assigned to the 3d Armored BCT, 1st Armored Division, stationed at Fort Bliss, Texas
  - 3rd Battalion is a combined arms battalion assigned to the 2nd Armored BCT, 3rd Infantry Division, stationed at Fort Stewart, Georgia
- 68th Armor "Ventre a Terre" (Belly to the Ground)
  - 1st Battalion is a combined arms battalion assigned to the 3rd Armored BCT, 4th Infantry Division, stationed at Fort Carson, Colorado
- 69th Armor "Vitesse et Puissance" (Speed and Power)
  - 2nd Battalion is a combined arms battalion assigned to the 2nd Armored BCT, 3rd Infantry Division, stationed at Fort Stewart, Georgia
  - 3rd Battalion is a combined arms battalion assigned to the 1st Armored BCT, 3rd Infantry Division, stationed at Fort Stewart, Georgia.
- 70th Armor
  - 2nd Battalion is a combined arms battalion assigned to the 1st Armored BCT, 1st Infantry Division, stationed at Fort Riley, Kansas.
  - 4th Battalion is a combined arms battalion assigned to the 1st Armored Brigade Combat Team, 1st Armored Division, stationed at Fort Bliss, Texas.
- 72nd Armor "Crusaders" - from at least 1996. In 1984-85, Isby and Kamps listed the 1-72 Armor and 2-72 Armor as part of the 1st Brigade, 2nd Infantry Division, Camp Casey, South Korea. They were respectively annotated as to be redesignated, at some undetermined date, the 4-69 Armor and the 2-73 Armor. At a later date, the 1st & 2nd Battalions, 72nd Armor, were attested as being assigned to the 2nd Infantry Division in Korea. 1st Battalion was inactivated in 2015 and 2nd Battalion was inactivated in 2005.
- 73rd Cavalry
  - 1st Squadron is the cavalry squadron assigned to 2nd Brigade Combat Team, 82nd Airborne Division, stationed at Fort Bragg, North Carolina
  - 3rd Squadron is the cavalry squadron assigned to 1st Brigade Combat Team, 82nd Airborne Division, stationed at Fort Bragg, North Carolina
  - 5th Squadron is the cavalry squadron assigned to 3rd Brigade Combat Team, 82nd Airborne Division, stationed at Fort Bragg, North Carolina
- 75th Cavalry
  - 1st Squadron is the cavalry squadron assigned to 2nd Brigade Combat Team, 101st Airborne Division, stationed at Ft Campbell, Kentucky
- 77th Armor
  - 1st Battalion is a combined arms battalion assigned to the 3rd Armored BCT, 1st Armored Division
- 81st Armor
- 82nd Cavalry
  - On 15 November 1965, the regiment reorganized to consist of the 1st Squadron in the 41st Infantry Division and Troop E with the 41st Infantry Brigade. On 1 March 1968, it was reorganized to consist of Troop E, part of the 41st Infantry Brigade.
- 89th Cavalry Regiment
  - 1st Squadron is the cavalry squadron assigned to the 2nd Infantry BCT, 10th Mountain Division, stationed at Fort Drum, New York
  - 3rd is the cavalry squadron assigned to the 3rd Infantry BCT, 10th Mountain Division, stationed at Fort Polk, Louisiana
- 91st Cavalry Regiment
  - 1st Squadron is the cavalry squadron assigned to the 173rd Airborne Brigade Combat Team, stationed at Grafenwoehr, Germany
- 94th Cavalry Regiment
  - 1st Squadron is the cavalry squadron assigned to the 1st Armored BCT, 34th Infantry Division, Minnesota Army National Guard
- 98th Cavalry Regiment

== 101 to 200 ==
- 101st Cavalry Regiment (United States) (New York Army National Guard)
- 102nd Cavalry Regiment. Designated the 102d Armor Regiment from 1968 to 2008.
  - 1st Squadron is part of 44th Infantry Brigade Combat Team of the New Jersey Army National Guard, 42nd Infantry Division.
- 103rd Armor Regiment (Pennsylvania Army National Guard)
  - 1st Battalion (Inactive)
  - 2nd Battalion (Inactive)
  - 3rd Battalion, 103rd Armor, as of 2011, is part of 55th Heavy Brigade Combat Team, 28th Infantry Division.
- 104th Cavalry Regiment (United States)(Pennsylvania Army National Guard)
- 106th Armor
  - Troop E: In 1952 Companies A and C of the 106th Tank Battalion were headquartered at Camp Lincoln in Illinois. The unit was reorganized on 1 February 1968 to consist of Troop E, an element of the 33rd Infantry Brigade.
- 107th Cavalry Regiment (Ohio Army National Guard)
- 108th Armored Cavalry Regiment (Mississippi Army National Guard) - Organized as the 750th Tank Battalion in the Mississippi Army National Guard with headquarters at Senatobia, MS, from 16 Feb-28 May 1956. Expanded, reorganized and redesignated with 1st, 2nd and 3rd Recce Squadrons, 108th Armored Cavalry Regiment, 1 May 1959. Ordered into Federal Service from 30 September 1962 – 23 October 1962. In 1968 the regimental headquarters became 1st Brigade, 30th Armored Division, MSARNG. 2nd and 3rd Recce Squadrons consolidated 15 February 1968 with 1st Squadron, 108th Armored Cavalry Regiment. In the late 1990s the squadron was organized as a separate regimental armored cavalry squadron and was equipped with M1A1 tanks and M3A2 cavalry fighting vehicles. 1st Squadron, 108th Armored Cavalry inactivated 2007. Note the 108th Armor Regiment existed at the same time in the Georgia Army National Guard, sometimes with the same battalion numbers.
- 108th Armor
- 109th Armor
- 110th Armor
- 112th Cavalry "Rarin' to Go" - From 1973 all of the Texas Army National Guard armor units were renumbered as battalions of the 112th Armor. From 1988–93 eight battalions were assigned to the 112th making it then the largest armored regiment in the U.S. Army.
  - 1st Squadron, 112th Cavalry - On 17 October 2008, the 4th Battalion, 112th Armor was renamed 1st Squadron, 112th Cavalry. The unit carries the colors and lineage of the original 112th Cavalry Regiment. The squadron Headquarters and Headquarters Troop are based in Bryan, Texas, with A Troop, B Troop and C Troop based in Taylor, Rosenberg and Ellington Field respectively. A and B Troops are equipped as cavalry units with HMMWVs, and C Troop is a dismounted infantry unit. The Squadron is part of the 72nd Infantry Brigade Combat Team of the 36th Infantry Division.
  - 2nd Battalion, 112th Armor - listed with 2nd Brigade, 1984-85
  - 3rd Battalion, 112th Armor - listed with 2nd Brigade, 1984-85
  - 4th Battalion, 112th Armor - listed with 3rd Brigade, 1984-85
  - 5th Battalion, 112th Armor - listed with 3rd Brigade, 1984-85
  - 6th Battalion, 112th Armor - listed with 1st Brigade, 1984-85
  - 7th Battalion, 112th Armor -
  - 8th Battalion, 112th Armor -
- 113th Cavalry Regiment (United States)
- 115th Armor
- 117th Cavalry Regiment (United States)
  - Originally 2nd Squadron of the 102nd Cavalry Regiment when mobilized overseas for WW2. November 30, 1943 the Squadron was reorganized and designated the 117th Cavalry Squadron Reconnaissance (Mecz). Service in North Africa, Rome/Arno, Southern France w/Arrowhead, Alsace, Rhineland and Central Germany campaigns. 117th Cavalry Regiment was consolidated with the 102nd Armor Regiment on 1 August 2008, and designated the 102nd Cavalry Regiment, with a single squadron which is part of the 44th Infantry Brigade Combat Team.
- 123rd Armor
- 124th Armor (now 136th Regiment)
- 124th Cavalry Regiment
- 125th Armor
- 126th Armor (now 126th Cavalry)
- 127th Armor - traces its origins as far back as 1838, to a company also known as the "Buffalo City Guards". 127th Tank Battalion (formed 1950) reorganized and redesignated as 127th Armor, a CARS parent regiment, on 16 March 1959. The regiment then consisted of the 1st Medium Tank Battalion, an element of the 27th Armored Division (United States). Circa 2005 the 1st Battalion was a tank unit of the 3rd Brigade, 42nd Infantry Division (United States) in Buffalo, NY. The 2nd Squadron, 101st Cavalry, also carries the lineage of the 1st Battalion, 127th Armor Regiment, which was converted into the 2nd Squadron, 101st Cav when the New York Army National Guard reorganized in 2005-2006.
- 131st Cavalry Regiment
- 137th Armor
- 138th Armor
- 145th Armor (formerly 145th Infantry)
- 147th Armored Regiment
- 149th Armor
- 150th Armor - one squadron of the 150th Cavalry listed with the 107th ACR in West Virginia in 1984-85 by Isby and Kamps 1985 (p. 385).
- 156th Armor "First to Fight"
- 170th Cavalry (California Army National Guard) – Redesignated 1963 in the California Army National Guard as a CARS parent regiment. Represented by 1st Squadron, 170th Cavalry, part of the 49th Infantry Division. Broken up and elements redesignated in 1968. Troop E, 170th Cavalry active with 49th Infantry Brigade until 1974.
- 172nd Cavalry Regiment (Vermont Army National Guard) - On 1 March 1959 the previous 172nd Infantry Regiment was split into the 172nd Infantry and 172nd Armor. Some elements were consolidated with the 124th Antiaircraft Artillery Battalion and converted and redesignated as the new 172nd Armor, a Combat Arms Regimental System parent regiment. The 172nd Armor was to consist of the 1st Medium Tank Battalion and the 2nd Reconnaissance Squadron, both part of the 43rd Infantry Division. The regiments were reorganized in 1963, 1964 (when the 172nd Infantry and 172nd Armor were merged) and 1968, when the 172nd Armor was reorganised in February to comprise the 1st and 2nd Battalions, elements of the 50th Armored Division. 1st Battalion, 172nd Armor and 2nd Battalion, 172nd Armor were both inactivated as the result of the 86th Brigade's conversion to Infantry, during 2006-08. Most units were reconfigured as parts of 1-172nd Cavalry or the 86th Brigade Special Troops Battalion.
  - 1st Squadron, 172nd Cavalry
  - 2nd Battalion, 172nd Armor - inactive.
- 174th Armor
- 185th Armor
- 187th Armor
- 194th Armor
- 195th Armor
- 196th Cavalry - (North Carolina Army National Guard) The regiment was originally constituted on 20 March 1959 as the 196th Armor as a parent regiment under the Combat Arms Regimental System and assigned to the 30th Infantry Division. Twelve days later, on 1 April 1959, 3rd Battalion, 139th Infantry Regiment and the 130th Tank Battalion, both from the 30th Infantry Division, were re-flagged and reassigned to the regiment as the 1st Reconnaissance Squadron and the 2nd Medium Tank Battalion, respectively.
  - 1st Reconnaissance Squadron (1959-1963)
  - 2nd Medium Tank Battalion (1959–63)
- 198th Armor Regiment

== 201 to 300 ==
- 202nd Cavalry – South Carolina Army National Guard, redesignated 1991 from 713th Cavalry
  - Troop B, 202nd Cavalry, active 1991–2008
- 203rd Armor - Missouri National Guard, 1963-68. The 108th Mechanized Cavalry Reconnaissance Squadron was redesignated 1 November 1949 as 203rd Antiaircraft Artillery Automatic Weapons Battalion (mobile), reorganized and redesignated 1 December 1952 as 203rd Antiaircraft Artillery Gun Battalion. redesignated 1 October 1953 as 203rd Antiaircraft Artillery Battalion (90mm). It was consolidated 15 April 1959 with 203rd Combat Arms Regiment, a parent regiment under the Combat Arms Regimental System. This was part of the larger reorganisation that placed the Army National Guard under the ROCID/Pentomic organization. The battalion was redesignated 1st Reconnaissance Squadron, 203rd Combat Arms Regiment, and had its units remain in place at Joplin, Anderson, Monett, and Neosho. It was then redesignated the 203rd Armor Regiment 1963, and then the 203rd Engineer Battalion in 1968.
- 205th Armor "Virtus Et Fortitude" (Courage and Fortitude)
- 208th Armor "Might for Right"
- 210th Armor "Ducit Amor Patriae" (Led by Love of Country)
- 237th Cavalry Regiment
- 238th Cavalry Regiment
- 240th Cavalry Regiment
- 245th Armor "Rolling Thunder"
- 246th Armor "Mailed Thunder"
- 252nd Armor "Ready Poised Decisive" - On 10 March 1963, the 196th Cavalry Regiment was reorganized as the 252nd Armor Regiment, consisting of 1st and 2nd Battalions as elements of the 30th Infantry Division (concurrently, the former 196th Armor Regiment was reconstituted and reorganized from existing units of the North Carolina Army National Guard as the 196th Cavalry Regiment, hereafter a separate lineage).
- 256th Cavalry Regiment
- 263rd Armor
- 278th Armored Cavalry Regiment (Tennessee Army National Guard)(1977)
  - RHHT (TN ARNG, HHT, 278th ACR)(Knoxville, TN)
  - 1st Squadron (TN ARNG, ArmdCav, 278th ACR)(Henderson, TN)
  - 2nd Squadron (TN ARNG, ArmdCav, 278th ACR)(Kingsport, TN)
  - 3rd Squadron (TN ARNG, ArmdCav, 278th ACR)(Temple, TX)
  - 4th Squadron (TN ARNG, AirCav, 278th ACR)(Smyrna, TN)
  - Spt Squadron (TN ARNG, ACRSptSqn, 278th ACR)(Knoxville, TN)
- 279th Cavalry Regiment (1946)
  - 1st Squadron (OK ARNG, RSTA (in formation?), 45th InfBde(L))(Tulsa, OK)(Listed as 1-279 INF with 45 IB(S) in Isby and Kamps 1985 (p. 384); seemingly last active September–December 2008, when 1st Battalion, 279th Infantry Regiment was redesignated 1-279 Cavalry, then quickly redesignated back to Infantry).
- 297th Cavalry Regiment

== 301 on ==
- 301st Cavalry Regiment – First constituted 1917 and broken up 1918 to create new artillery units. Reconstituted as Organized Reserve unit 1921 and converted to signal aircraft warning regiment 1942. Its interwar headquarters was successively at Syracuse, Buffalo, and Rochester, New York. The 301st was part of the 61st Cavalry Division.
- 302nd Cavalry Regiment – First constituted 1917 and broken up 1918 to create new artillery units. Reconstituted as Organized Reserve unit 1921 and converted to tank destroyer battalion 1942. Its interwar headquarters was at Newark, New Jersey, and it was part of the 61st Cavalry Division. Reactivated as training regiment 1971 and 1973, inactivated by mid-2000s.
- 303rd Armor Regiment "Fire and Movement" - The regiment traces its history from the 803d Tank Battalion, redesignated from 803d Tank Destroyer Battalion on 13 September 1946. Reorganized and federally recognized 18 March 1947 with HQ at Centralia. Reorganized and redesignated 15 April 1959 as the 303d Armor, with one battalion (1959-1963), two battalions (1963-1968), and one battalion from that date. Consolidated with 803d Armor (constituted 1 January 1974) between 15 April and 1 September 1993. Now consolidated with 303rd Cavalry as 303rd Cavalry Regiment.
- 304th Cavalry Regiment – First constituted 1917 and broken up 1918 to create new artillery units. Reconstituted as Organized Reserve unit 1921 and converted to tank destroyer battalion 1942. Its interwar headquarters was in Brooklyn, and it was part of the 61st Cavalry Division.
- 305th Cavalry Regiment (1917 (Disbanded 1943))
- 306th Cavalry Regiment – First constituted 1917 and broken up 1918 to create new artillery units. Reconstituted as Organized Reserve unit 1921 and converted to signal aircraft warning regiment 1942. Its interwar headquarters was at Baltimore, Maryland, and it was part of the 62nd Cavalry Division.
- 307th Cavalry Regiment – First constituted 1917 and broken up 1918 to create new artillery units. Reconstituted as Organized Reserve unit 1921 and converted to tank destroyer battalion 1942. Its interwar headquarters was at Richmond, Virginia, and it was part of the 62nd Cavalry Division.
- 308th Cavalry Regiment – First constituted 1917 and broken up 1918 to create new artillery units. Reconstituted as Organized Reserve unit 1921 and converted to tank destroyer battalion 1942. Its interwar headquarters was at Cumberland, Maryland, and then Pittsburgh, and it was part of the 62nd Cavalry Division.
- 309th Cavalry Regiment – First constituted 1917 and broken up 1918 to create new artillery units. Reconstituted as Organized Reserve unit 1921 and converted to signal aircraft warning regiment 1942. Part of the 63rd Cavalry Division, its interwar headquarters was at Asheville, North Carolina, and later Atlanta.
- 310th Cavalry Regiment – First constituted 1917 and broken up 1918 to create new artillery units. Reconstituted as Organized Reserve unit 1921 and disbanded 1943. Part of the 63rd Cavalry Division, its interwar headquarters was at Knoxville, Tennessee, and later Athens, Georgia.
- 311th Cavalry Regiment
- 312th Cavalry Regiment
- 313th Cavalry Regiment (1917 (Disbanded 1943))
- 314th Cavalry Regiment
- 315th Cavalry Regiment (1917 (Disbanded 1943))
- 316th Cavalry Regiment
- 317th Cavalry Regiment (1921 (Disbanded 1943))
- 318th Cavalry Regiment
- 319th Cavalry Regiment
- 320th Cavalry Regiment
- 321st Cavalry Regiment
- 322nd Cavalry Regiment (1921, 1971)
  - 1st Squadron (1971, AR, IA)
  - 2nd Squadron (c. 1975, AR, IA)
- 323rd Cavalry Regiment
- 324th Cavalry Regiment
- 348th Cavalry Regiment (GA ARNG)(1973)
  - E Troop (GA ARNG, IA)
- 632nd Armor Regiment "Age aut Perfice" (Act or Achieve) - On 1 April 1963, the regiment was created on the basis of elements of the 105th Armor Regiment. The regiment had two battalions, but was reduced to a single battalion, 1-632 Armor, on 30 December 1967. At times, the battalion was part of the 32nd Infantry Division (later 32nd Infantry Brigade) and the battalion was also a non-divisional unit for some periods. In late 2001, the 632nd Armor Regiment was inactivated as a result of a reorganization of the 32nd Infantry Brigade.
- 635th Armor Regiment "Will to Win" - The regiment was constituted in the Air National Guard on March 25, 1953 as the 891st Engineer Aviation Battalion. On August 1, 1953 it was allotted to the Kansas National Guard. It was reorganized and federally recognized January 13, 1954 with headquarters at Manhattan, Kansas. Redesignated in January 1957 as the 891st Engineer Battalion. Converted again to the 635th Armor on February 1, 1976, consisting of the 1st Battalion. In 1984 the battalion was part of the 69th Infantry Brigade. Reorganised again on March 1, 1990 to comprise the 1st and 2nd Battalions at Manhattan and Salina, respectively. The 1st Battalion, 635th Armor, part of the 40th Infantry Division (California) as of 1998. This unit was deactivated in September 2008, its former troops becoming part of the 2nd Battalion, 137th Regiment (Combined Arms Battalion). 2-137 INF was renamed 1-635 Armor in October 2020.
- 713th Cavalry Regiment (South Carolina Army National Guard) Constituted 1973, redesignated 202nd Cavalry 1991.
  - Troop B active 1974–1991.
- 748th Cavalry Regiment – Redesignated 1963 in the Georgia Army National Guard. Regimental units broken up and redesignated 1968.
- 803rd Armor Regiment "Yield to Us" - Part of Washington Army National Guard. Organized 1 January 1974, including 1st Battalion, a nondivisional separate battalion; consolidated with 303rd Armor between 15 April and 1 September 1993.

== See also ==
- List of infantry battalions of the Army National Guard from 1959
- List of tank destroyer units of the United States Army
