= 62nd Cavalry Division (United States) =

62d Cavalry Division
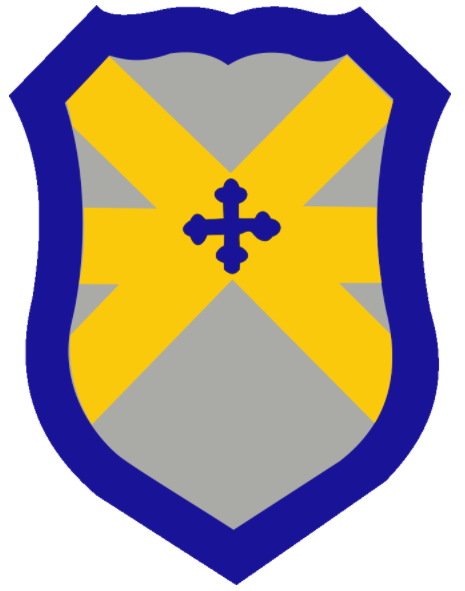
- 62d Cavalry Division Shoulder Sleeve Insignia
- Active: 1921–1942
- Country: United States of America
- Branch: United States Army
- Type: Cavalry
- Size: Division
- Part of: Army Reserve
- Garrison/HQ: Towson, Maryland

The 62nd Cavalry Division was an Organized Reserve cavalry unit of the United States Army.

It was created in 1921 due to a perceived need for additional cavalry units, and was numbered in succession of the Regular Army Divisions, which were not all active at its creation. Going into World War II, the US Army Cavalry contained 3 Regular, 4 National Guard, and 6 Organized Reserve cavalry divisions as well as the independent 56th Cavalry Brigade from Texas. After the American entry into World War II, its men were called up for active duty and the division was disbanded in early 1942.

== History ==
The 62d Cavalry Division was constituted on 15 October 1921, part of the Fourth Army and the Third Corps Area. Lieutenant Colonel William R. Taylor initiated its headquarters at 27 West Washington Street in Hagerstown, Maryland on 7 September. It was officially activated shortly afterwards with a strength of only 70 officers on 31 December 1921. On 30 June 1924, the headquarters was moved to the York and Allegheny Avenues in Towson, Maryland. By 31 July 1925, when all authorized units had been activated, it had 355 officers and 43 enlisted men. The division consisted of a headquarters and headquarters troop, the 153rd Cavalry Brigade at Baltimore and the 154th Cavalry Brigade at Richmond, each with two regiments, and support units. It included reserve units from Maryland, Virginia, the District of Columbia, and Pennsylvania. On 1 July 1929, the division's machine gun squadrons were eliminated and absorbed into other units. During its existence, the 462d Armored Car Squadron and 462d Tank Company (Light) were added to the division, and the 462d Field Artillery Battalion was expanded into the 862d Field Artillery Regiment. In 1933, when field armies were reactivated, the 62d transferred to the First Army.

The division generally conducted inactive training between September and May, with most subordinate units holding training meetings at the National Guard army in the city where they were stationed. During the summer, the division usually held training camps at Fort Myer, supported by the 3rd Cavalry Regiment. Alternately, its cavalry units trained cavalry elements of the Citizens' Military Training Camp at Fort Myer and Fort Belvoir. Division support units conducted summer training with units from their own branch. Starting in 1930, the 62d's training became more varied with the increasing experience of the division staff, participating in a command post exercises for the Third Corps Area at Fort Meade in July of that year. After the operation of Civilian Conservation Corps camps was handed over to reserve units in 1934, 87 division officers were on active duty working with the CCC in November 1935.

After the 61st Cavalry Division's 152nd Cavalry Brigade spent a successful summer training period alongside the 62d Division at Fort Myer in 1937, the entire 61st Division joined the 62d at Fort Myer for the summer training periods of 1938 and 1939, the latter of which was centered on preparing the reservists for the upcoming summer 1940 maneuvers in upstate New York. Also during the 1939 summer training period, elements of the division participated in Third Corps Area maneuvers in northern Virginia. In February 1938, future World War II armor commander Colonel Bruce C. Clarke became division chief of staff, holding the position until 1940. On 1 April 1938, Major General James K. Parsons took command of the division while simultaneously commanding the Third Corps Area. On 27 September 1940, the division headquarters was relocated to the Hurst Building in Baltimore. After the Attack on Pearl Harbor resulted in American entry into World War II, the division was disbanded on 30 January 1942, by which time it had practically ceased to exist due to the calling up for active duty of most of its officers.

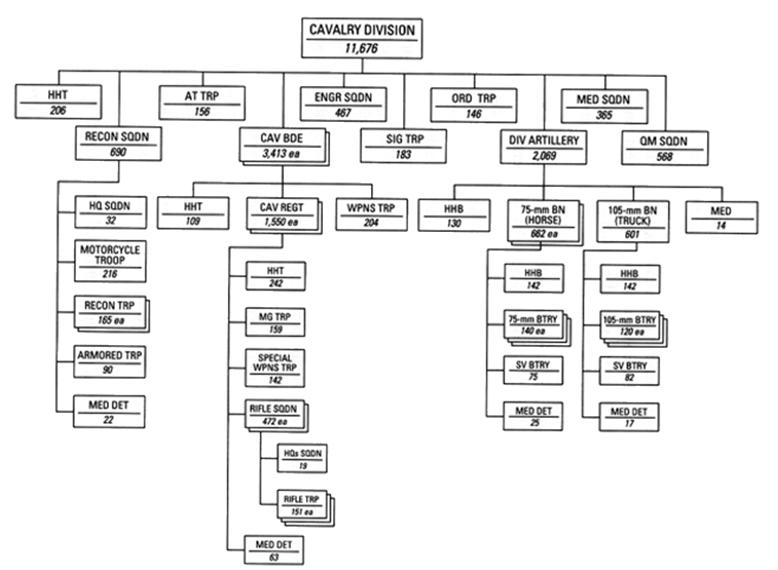
Standard organization chart for a Cavalry Division in November 1940

=== Organization ===
In early 1940, the division included the following units:

- Headquarters & Headquarters Troop (Towson)
  - 62d Signal Troop (Towson)
  - 582d Ordnance Company (Medium) (Towson)
  - 462d Tank Company (Light) (Baltimore)
- 153rd Cavalry Brigade (Baltimore)
  - 305th Cavalry Regiment (Philadelphia)
  - 306th Cavalry Regiment (Baltimore)
- 154th Cavalry Brigade (Richmond)
  - 307th Cavalry Regiment (Richmond)
  - 308th Cavalry Regiment (Pittsburgh)
- 862d Field Artillery Regiment (Baltimore)
- 462d Quartermaster Squadron (Winchester)
- 462d Reconnaissance Squadron (Washington, D.C.)
- 402d Engineer Squadron (Baltimore)
- 362d Medical Squadron (Baltimore)

== See also ==
- United States Army branch insignia
- List of armored regiments of the United States Army
- Formations of the United States Army
