= 154th Cavalry Brigade =

- Active: 1922–1942
- Country: United States
- Branch: United States Army
- Type: Cavalry
- Part of: 62nd Cavalry Division
- Garrison/HQ: Richmond, Virginia

The 154th Cavalry Brigade was a cavalry unit of the United States Army Organized Reserve during the interwar period. Organized in 1922, the brigade spent its entire career with the 62nd Cavalry Division and was disbanded after the United States entered World War II.

== History ==
The brigade was constituted in the Organized Reserve on 15 October 1921, part of the 62nd Cavalry Division in the Third Corps Area. It included the 307th and 308th Cavalry Regiments and the 154th Machine Gun Squadron at Norfolk. In 1922, the brigade headquarters was initiated (organized) at Richmond, Virginia. On 20 December 1928, the 154th Machine Gun Squadron was relieved from its assignment to the 62nd and withdrawn from the Organized Reserves, with its personnel transferred to the 307th's new 3rd Squadron and Machine Gun Troop.

The brigade held its inactive training period meetings at the Parcel Post Building in Richmond. Between 1923 and 1940, the 154th usually conducted summer training at Fort Meade in Maryland, occasionally holding summer training with the 3rd Cavalry Regiment at Fort Myer or Fort Belvoir. Its subordinate regiments provided basic military instruction to civilians under the Citizens' Military Training Camp program at Fort Myer and Fort Belvoir with the assistance of the 3rd Cavalry as an alternate form of training. During its participation in the July 1930 Third Corps Area command post exercise, the brigade was temporarily commanded by 306th Cavalry commander, politician, and lawyer John Philip Hill. After the United States entered World War II, the brigade was disbanded on 30 January 1942 along with the division, after most of its officers were called up for active duty.

== Commanders ==
The brigade is known to have been commanded by the following officers:

- Major John C. Butler (as of March 1925–30 June 1930)
- Colonel John Phillip Hill (30 June–1 August 1930)
- Lieutenant Colonel John C. Butler (1 August 1930–after June 1933)
- Lieutenant Colonel John H. Schenkel (as of May 1934–December 1937)
- Major John P. Dean (June 1938–10 January 1940)
- Major Moderwell K. Salen (10 January 1940–January 1941)
