= 154th Brigade =

154th Brigade may refer to:

- 154th Brigade (Croatia)
- 154th Mechanized Brigade, Ukraine
- 154th Infantry Brigade (United Kingdom)
- 154th Cavalry Brigade, United States

== See also ==
- 154th Division (disambiguation)
- 154th Regiment (disambiguation)
