= 308th Regiment =

- 308th Regiment may refer to:
- 308th Armored Cavalry Regiment
- 308th Cavalry Regiment
- 308th Infantry Regiment

== See also ==
- 308th Division (disambiguation)
