= 305th Regiment =

305th Regiment may refer to:

- 305th Armored Cavalry Regiment, United States
- 305th Cavalry Regiment, United States
- 305th Electronic Warfare Regiment, Ukraine
- 305th Infantry Regiment, United States
- 305th (Bedfordshire Yeomanry) Medium Regiment, Royal Artillery

== See also ==
- 305th Division (disambiguation)
