= 153rd Cavalry Brigade =

- Active: 1922–1942
- Country: United States
- Branch: United States Army
- Type: Cavalry
- Part of: 62nd Cavalry Division
- Garrison/HQ: Baltimore

The 153rd Cavalry Brigade was a cavalry unit of the United States Army Organized Reserve during the interwar period. Organized in 1922, the brigade spent its entire career with the 62nd Cavalry Division and was disbanded after the United States entered World War II.

== History ==
The brigade was constituted in the Organized Reserve on October 15, 1921, part of the 62nd Cavalry Division in the Third Corps Area. It included the 305th and 306th Cavalry Regiments and the 153rd Machine Gun Squadron at Baltimore. In September 1922, the brigade headquarters was initiated (organized) at Baltimore. On December 20, 1928, the 153rd Machine Gun Squadron was relieved from its assignment to the 62nd and withdrawn from the Organized Reserves, with its personnel transferred to the 306th's new 3rd Squadron and Machine Gun Troop.

The brigade held its inactive training period meetings at the Post Office Building in Baltimore. Between 1923 and 1940, the 153rd usually conducted summer training at Fort Meade in Maryland, occasionally holding summer training with the 3rd Cavalry Regiment at Fort Myer or Fort Belvoir. Its subordinate regiments provided basic military instruction to civilians under the Citizens' Military Training Camp program at Fort Myer and Fort Belvoir with the assistance of the 3rd Cavalry as an alternate form of training. After the United States entered World War II, the brigade was disbanded on January 30, 1942, along with the division, after most of its officers were called up for active duty.

== Commanders ==
The brigade is known to have been commanded by the following officers:

- Colonel William M. Winter (September 1922–2 July 1924)
- Major James F. Tompkins (March 1925–October 1928)
- Major Edwin P. Rutan (June 1930–March 18, 1931)
- Major Max Livingston Jr. (March 18, 1931 – June 13, 1935)
- Major Henry P. Ames (June 13, 1935 – January 23, 1938)
- Major Edwin P. Rutan (January 23-August 1, 1938)
- Lieutenant Colonel Edward B. Harry (August 1, 1938–August 1941)
