= 314th Regiment =

314th Regiment may refer to:

- 314th Armored Cavalry Regiment
- 314th Cavalry Regiment
- 314th Infantry Regiment
