= 313th Regiment =

313th Regiment may refer to:

- 313th Cavalry Regiment, United States
- 313th (Sussex) Heavy Anti-Aircraft Regiment, Royal Artillery
