= 306th Regiment =

306th Regiment may refer to:

- 306th Armored Cavalry Regiment, United States
- 306th Infantry Regiment, United States
- 306th (Lancashire Hussars) Heavy Anti-Aircraft Regiment, Royal Artillery
