= 154th =

154th is the ordinal form of the number 154. 154th or One hundred and fifty-fourth may also refer to:

- A fraction, 1/154, equal to one of 154 equal parts

== Geography ==
- 154th meridian east, a line of longitude
- 154th meridian west, a line of longitude

== Military ==
- 154th Brigade (disambiguation)
- 154th Division (disambiguation)
- 154th Regiment (disambiguation)

== See also ==
- June 3, 154th day of the year in a standard year
