= 308th Armored Cavalry Regiment =

- Active: 1949–1950
- Country: United States
- Branch: United States Army
- Type: Cavalry
- Role: Reconnaissance
- Garrison/HQ: Minneapolis

The 308th Armored Cavalry Regiment (308th ACR) was a Minnesota-based reconnaissance unit of the United States Army Organized Reserve Corps, which briefly existed after World War II. Its 1st Battalion traced its heritage back to a World War II Tank destroyer battalion.

== History ==
The 308th Armored Cavalry was constituted on 21 October 1948 in the Organized Reserve Corps, and partially organized from existing units on 22 March 1949. It consisted of a headquarters and headquarters company and one battalion. Its headquarters and headquarters company was redesignated from the headquarters and headquarters troop of the 308th Cavalry Group, Mechanized, which had been constituted on 18 November 1946 in the Organized Reserve and activated on 26 December of that year in Minneapolis.

The 308th's 1st Battalion was redesignated from the 315th Mechanized Cavalry Reconnaissance Squadron. The 315th traced its heritage back to the 815th Tank Destroyer Battalion, constituted on 25 March 1942 in the Army of the United States and activated on 11 May of that year at Camp Cooke, California. It was equipped with the 3 inch towed anti-tank gun. The battalion embarked for New Guinea from the San Francisco Port of Embarkation on 10 March 1944. It landed there on 30 March and fought in the New Guinea campaign, and was disbanded in New Guinea on 27 September, after the Army began deactivating units unnecessary for jungle warfare. The personnel of the battalion were sent to the 112th Cavalry Regiment as replacements. Postwar, the battalion was reconstituted as the 315th Squadron on 22 October 1946 in the Organized Reserve and activated on 31 October of that year at Saint Paul. The 308th inherited the squadron's New Guinea Campaign streamer.

The headquarters and headquarters company and the 1st Battalion were inactivated on 4 December 1950 at Minneapolis and Saint Paul, respectively, and the regiment was disbanded on 10 March 1952. The 308th ACR did not inherit the lineage of the prewar 308th Cavalry Regiment, and was not authorized a coat of arms or distinctive unit insignia.
