= James K. Parsons =

United States Army general (1877–1960)

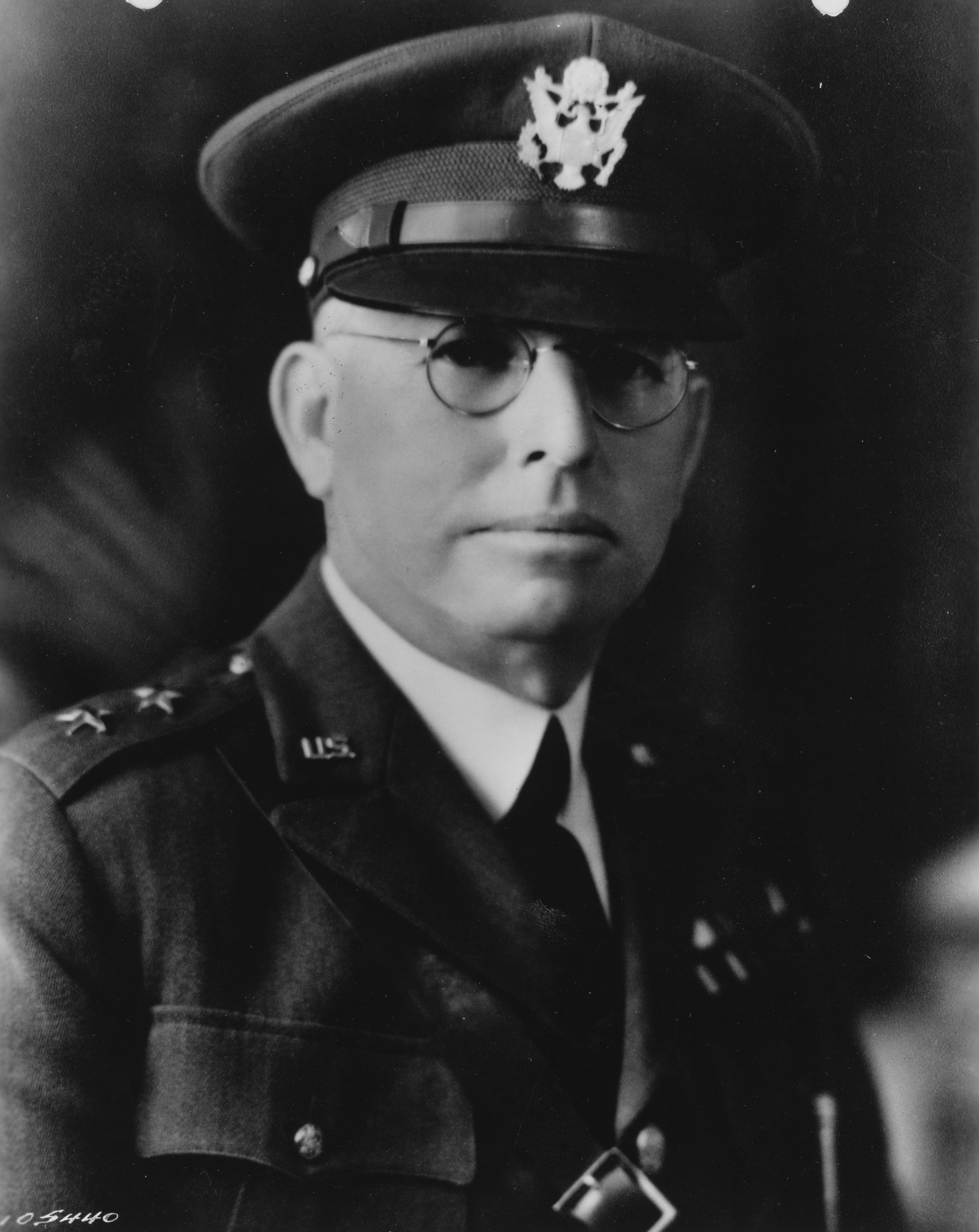
- Parsons as 2nd Infantry Division commander c. 1937
- Born: February 11, 1877; Rockford, Alabama, United States
- Died: November 8, 1960 (aged 83); Venice, Italy
- Burial place: Arlington National Cemetery
- Spouse: Volinda Lucy Henderson (m. 1904–1957, her death)
- Relatives: Lewis E. Parsons (grandfather)
- Military career
- Allegiance: United States
- Branch: United States Army
- Service years: 1898–1941
- Rank: Major General
- Commands: First United States Army; Third Corps Area; 2nd Infantry Division; 5th Infantry Brigade; 23rd Infantry Brigade; 9th Coast Artillery District; United States Army Armor School; Embarkation Center, Saint-Nazaire; 39th Infantry Regiment
- Conflicts: Spanish–American War; Philippine Insurrection; World War I World War II
- Awards: Distinguished Service Cross; Army Distinguished Service Medal; Purple Heart

James Kelly Parsons (February 11, 1877 – November 8, 1960) was a career officer in the United States Army. He attained the rank of major general, and was notable for his command of the 39th Infantry Regiment in France during World War I, and his post-war command of the Army's tank school, 23rd Infantry Brigade, 5th Infantry Brigade, and 2nd Infantry Division. He closed his career as commander of Third Corps Area and interim commander of the First United States Army, positions in which he supervised training exercises designed to prepare units for overseas service as the Army began to expand at the start of World War II.

== Early life ==
James Kelly Parsons was born in Rockford, Alabama, on February 11, 1877. He was the son of Catherine "Kate" (Kelly) Parsons and Lewis E. Parsons (1846–1916), a lawyer who served as United States Attorney for the Northern District of Alabama.

Parsons' grandfather, also named Lewis E. Parsons (1817–1895), was provisional Governor of Alabama after the American Civil War, and was elected to the United States Senate during the Reconstruction Era, but was not allowed to take his seat because Alabama had not yet attained full readmission to the Union.

Parsons attended the schools of Birmingham, Alabama, and graduated from Paul Hayne School and the Taylor School. He then began the study of law under Birmingham attorney William Columbus Ward. In 1898 he was commissioned for the Spanish–American War as a first lieutenant in the 3rd Alabama Volunteer Infantry, a unit of African American soldiers and white officers. His regimental commander was Robert Lee Bullard, and Parsons' connection to Bullard helped Parsons receive a commission in the regular army and continue his military career.

== Early career ==
Parsons remained in the United States Army after the war with Spain, receiving his commission as a second lieutenant in the 20th Infantry in 1899. He served in the Philippine Insurrection until 1901, when he was promoted to first lieutenant in the 28th Infantry, and later that year transferred back to the 20th Infantry. He graduated from the Infantry and Cavalry School in 1904. In 1908 he received promotion to captain, and his assignments at this rank included command of Company F, 20th Infantry Regiment in Hawaii. He was promoted to major in 1917.

In the years before World War I Parsons served as mustering officer at Camp Glenn near Morehead City, North Carolina, and then as an observer and advisor with the New York National Guard.

== World War I ==
At the start of World War I Parsons was promoted to temporary lieutenant colonel and then temporary colonel, and assigned to the staff of the American Expeditionary Forces in France. He later served as commander of the 39th Infantry Regiment, 4th Infantry Division. He was gassed during a German attack on October 11, 1918, and was relieved by Troy H. Middleton. In 1919 Parsons received the Distinguished Service Cross for heroism as commander of the 39th Infantry. The citation for his DSC reads:

The President of the United States of America, authorized by Act of Congress, July 9, 1918, takes pleasure in presenting the Distinguished Service Cross to Colonel (Infantry) James Kelly Parsons, United States Army, for extraordinary heroism in action while serving with 39th Infantry Regiment, 4th Division, A.E.F., near Cuisy, France, 27 September 1918, to 11 October 1918. Having volunteered to take command of a battalion, whose commander had been wounded, Colonel Parsons was knocked down by hostile shell fire, but he succeeded in rallying his men and kept them well organized, so as to withstand the heavy fire of the enemy. On the following day he assumed command of the regiment and commanded it in successful attacks, refusing to be evacuated after being so severely gassed that he was unable to see.

Service: Army Rank: Colonel Division: 4th Division, American Expeditionary Forces General Orders: War Department, General Orders No. 98 (1919)

In addition, he received the Army Distinguished Service Medal for his post-war command of the Embarkation Center at Saint-Nazaire, which processed American service members for their post-war return trips to the United States. His DSM citation reads:

The President of the United States of America, authorized by Act of Congress, July 9, 1918, takes pleasure in presenting the Army Distinguished Service Medal to Colonel (Infantry) James Kelly Parsons, United States Army, for exceptionally meritorious and distinguished services to the Government of the United States, in a duty of great responsibility during World War I. Colonel Parsons organized and commanded with great energy and ability the Embarkation Camp at St. Nazaire, France, and handled with conspicuous success the reception, care, and departure of the large number of officers and soldiers passing through that camp en route to the United States. He demonstrated administrative abilities of a high order and performed services of great value to the American Expeditionary Forces.

Service: Army Rank: Colonel General Orders: War Department, General Orders No. 59 (1921)

Parsons also received the Purple Heart for wounds received while in command of the 39th Regiment.

== Interbellum ==
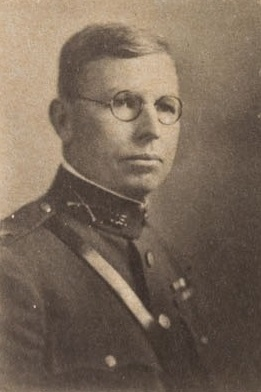
Parsons as a Naval War College student in 1925

After the war Parsons returned to his permanent rank of major. He was promoted to permanent lieutenant colonel in 1920 and permanent colonel in 1923. His assignments included again serving as inspector and advisor for the New York National Guard, and serving on a board to recommend armory locations, training sites, and unit types and sizes for the Indiana National Guard. Parsons graduated from the United States Army Command and General Staff College in 1923, the United States Army War College in 1924, and the Naval War College in 1925. He received promotion to brigadier general in 1930 and major general in 1936.

In 1930 and 1931 Parsons commanded the 9th Coast Artillery District in San Francisco. He was commander of the 23rd Infantry Brigade at Fort William McKinley, Philippines from 1931 to 1933, and the 5th Infantry Brigade at Vancouver Barracks, Washington from 1933 to 1936.

=== Advocate of integration ===
In the 1920s Parsons was recognized as a proponent of racial integration, in contrast to most of his professional colleagues. In 1924 the Army War College surveyed commissioned officers about whether and how to integrate Army units. At the time, African Americans served in segregated units, usually under white officers. Based on his experience in the Spanish–American War and his observations of African American soldiers during World War I, Parsons argued for desegregating army units and having each one incorporate a set percentage of black soldiers. In his view, black soldiers could be expected to perform capably if given the same training as whites, and incorporating them into units with whites would prevent them from being singled out for inferior duties like kitchen patrol and the loading and unloading of cargo. Parsons was convinced that African Americans could also serve as officers, although his point of view was that they would not be able to lead white soldiers effectively due to the prejudice of the times, but could instead aspire to command positions in the transportation and supply units that often contained large numbers of black soldiers in wartime. The army did not agree with Parsons' recommendations, and continued to allow African Americans to serve only in segregated units, and with few opportunities for assignment to leadership positions.

=== Advocate of mechanization ===
Parsons commanded the Army's tank school at Fort Meade, Maryland in 1925, and then again from 1929 to 1930. While at the tank school he developed plans for a mechanized army that were not adopted at the time, but which were similar to the designs for the armor and infantry divisions the United States Army fielded in World War II.

== World War II ==
Parsons commanded the 2nd Infantry Division at Fort Sam Houston, Texas, from 1936 to 1938, and from 1938 until 1940 he commanded the Third Corps Area with headquarters in Baltimore, Maryland. In 1938 he also served as interim commander of First United States Army. As corps area commander, Parsons oversaw the planning, execution and evaluation of exercises designed to assess the fitness of units, staffs and commanders as the army expanded and increased readiness at the start World War II.

== Development of new field jacket ==
While in command of Third Corps Area, Parsons oversaw development and fielding of a new field jacket, the M1941, which was used by the army throughout World War II. Parsons had launched the project after identifying a need to replace the wool coat then in use with an outer garment that was lightweight, water repellent, and windproof, and could incorporate a liner for warmth during the winter.

== Retirement ==
In February 1941 Parsons reached the mandatory retirement age of 64 and concluded his military service.

Parsons died aboard the ship RMS Caronia on November 8, 1960, while in port at Venice, Italy. He was buried at Arlington National Cemetery, Section 1, Site 325-B.

== Family ==
In 1904 Parsons married Volinda Lucy Henderson (1880–1957) in Columbus, Ohio. Volinda Parsons was the daughter of Charles G. Henderson and Ellen Beatty, the granddaughter of Union Army General John Beatty, and a 1904 graduate of Vassar College. James and Volinda Parsons had no children.

Military offices
Preceded by George S. Simonds	Commandant of the United States Army Armor School; 1925	Succeeded by Claude H. Miller
Preceded by Oliver S. Eskridge	Commandant of the United States Army Armor School; 1929–1930	Succeeded by Henry L. Cooper
Preceded by Herbert J. Brees	Commander of the 2nd Infantry Division; 1936–1938	Succeeded by Frank W. Rowell
Preceded by Frank Ross McCoy	Commander of the First United States Army (Acting); 1938	Succeeded by Hugh Aloysius Drum
Preceded by John W. Gulick	Commander of the Third Corps Area; 1938–1940	Succeeded by Walter S. Grant
