= 305th Cavalry Regiment =

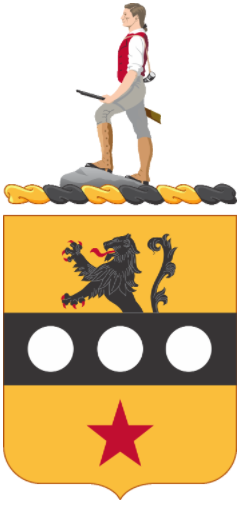
- Coat of Arms of the 305th Cavalry Regiment
- Active: 1917–1918; 1921–1943
- Country: United States
- Branch: United States Army
- Type: Cavalry
- Part of: 62nd Cavalry Division (1921–1942)
- Garrison/HQ: Philadelphia (1921–1942)
- Motto: Spectemur Agendo (Let Us Be Judged By Our Actions)
- Anniversaries: 17 April

Insignia
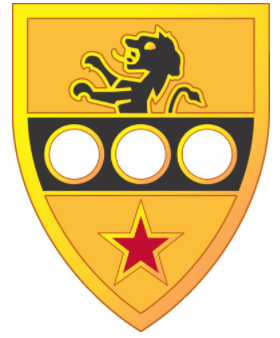
- Distinctive Unit Insignia

The 305th Cavalry Regiment was a cavalry unit of the United States Army during World War I and the interwar period. It was activated in early 1918 but broken up in the middle of the year to form new artillery units. The unit was recreated as a Pennsylvania Organized Reserve unit during the interwar period, and was disbanded after the United States entered World War II.

== History ==
Shortly after the United States entered World War I, the regiment was constituted in the National Army on 18 May 1917, and organized on 3 February 1918 at Camp Stanley, Texas. However, it was broken up on 15 August and its men were used to create the 44th and 45th Field Artillery Regiments, and the 15th Trench Mortar Battery. The 44th and 45th Field Artillery and the 15th Trench Mortar Battery were demobilized on 17 February 1919 at Camp Stanley.

On 15 October 1921, the 44th and 45th Field Artillery and the 15th Trench Mortar Battery were reconstituted in the Organized Reserve as the 305th Cavalry Regiment, part of the 62nd Cavalry Division in the Third Corps Area. The 305th was initiated (activated) in December with the entire regiment located in Philadelphia and headquarters at Schuylkill Arsenal. It became part of the division's 153rd Cavalry Brigade. In July 1928, it conducted training with units of the 52nd Cavalry Brigade at Mount Gretna, Pennsylvania. On 11 December 1929, it became a three-squadron regiment, with the new 3rd Squadron being activated at Philadelphia.

The 305th usually held its inactive training period meetings at the armories of either the 103rd Cavalry Regiment or the First City Troop. It conducted regular equestrian training on the horses of the Valley Forge Military Academy and often participated as a mounted unit in Philadelphia's Army Day parade. The regiment conducted summer training at Fort Myer and Fort Belvoir with the 3rd Cavalry Regiment. As an alternate form of training, the 305th provided basic military instruction to civilians under the Citizens' Military Training Camp program at Fort Myer. Its designated mobilization training station was the York Concentration Area in Pennsylvania.

After the United States entered World War II, it was disbanded on 18 October 1943 due to most of its officers being called up for active duty. An unrelated reserve unit, the 305th Armored Cavalry Regiment, briefly existed after the war in Indiana.

== Commanders ==
The 305th was commanded by the following officers:

- Colonel Albert E. Sexton (2 February–15 August 1918)
- Colonel John C. Groome (December 1921–29 March 1926)
- Colonel Jean H.A. Day (29 March–15 September 1926)
- Colonel William I. Forbes (15 September 1926 – 23 November 1932)
- Colonel Matthew F. James (23 November 1932–March 1936)
- Lieutenant Colonel Robert D. McCullough (March–10 September 1936)
- Colonel Vincent A. Carroll (10 September 1936–January 1941)
- Lieutenant Colonel Robert D. McCullough (January–26 August 1941)

== Heraldry ==
The 305th's coat of arms was approved on 29 October 1924, and its distinctive unit insignia was approved on 30 January 1925. Both were rescinded on 2 February 1959. The distinctive unit insignia included a 1 1/8 in (2.86 cm) gold colored metal and enamel device, which consisted of a yellow shield divided by a black stripe with three plates in the center. A lion rampant was depicted above the stripe, and a red star with yellow border below it. The shield's color symbolized the cavalry, the stripe and lion were taken from William Penn's coat of arms, and the red star symbolized the 305th's initial organization in Texas and its artillery service. The regimental coat of arms was of a similar design to the distinctive unit insignia but included the Organized Reserve's Minuteman crest above the shield.
