= 64th Cavalry Division (United States) =

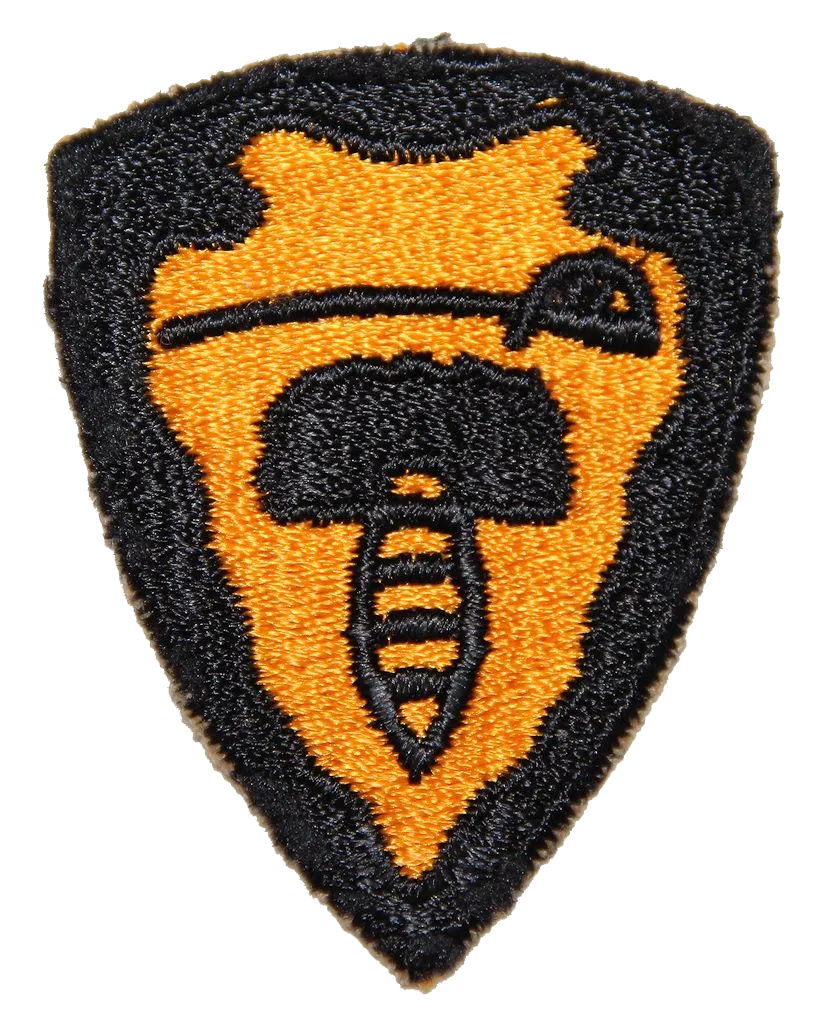
- Active: 15 October 1921–30 January 1942
- Country: United States of America
- Branch: United States Army
- Type: Cavalry
- Size: Division
- Part of: Fifth Corps Area
- Nickname: Arrowhead

Insignia
- Headquarters: Louisville, KY

The 64th Cavalry Division of the United States Army Organized Reserve was created from the perceived need for additional cavalry units. It numbered in succession of the Regular Army Divisions, which were not all active at its creation. The 64th Cavalry Division was dispersed across the United States. The division was composed of personnel from Kentucky, Massachusetts, Vermont, New Hampshire and West Virginia.

Lieutenant Colonel Steven Clay writes that the division was "constituted 15 October 1921, allotted to the First and Fifth Corps Areas, and assigned to the Fifth Army. The division [headquarters] was initiated 22 October 1921 at the Post Office Building in Lexington, KY, by Lt. Col. Richard W. Walker. The division HQ was moved to Louisville, KY, on 14 March 1922 to provide a more central location for ..the cavalry units in the Fifth Corps Area. On official activation, the division began to flourish rapidly. By the end of 1922, the division was 62 percent complete. By 1926, the 64th Cav. Div. boasted 336 officers and 47 enlisted men and all authorized units had been activated."

"Due to the lack of horses, equipment, and enlisted men, the 64th Cav. Div. did not participate in the [1937] Second Army maneuver as an organized division. Instead, the members of the division (minus the 158th Brigade) reinforced [Regular Army or National Guard] units to bring them up to wartime strength in officers or by acting as umpires. In general, elements of the division reinforced the 7th and 54th Cav. Brigs., which participated in the Fifth Corps Area portion of the maneuvers held at Fort Knox. In all, over 200 officers from the division participated. The next major event for the division was the Second Army maneuver held in central Wisconsin in August 1940. This time, the officers of the 64th reinforced the 1st Sq., 14th Cav., but also provided a substantial number of officers to the 38th Div. as well. The 1940 maneuver in Wisconsin was the division’s last major training event, for although the 64th was not officially disbanded until [30] January 1942, it had almost ceased to exist by then. Most of the assigned personnel had already been called to Active Duty, leaving only a shell of the former organizations."

== Structure ==
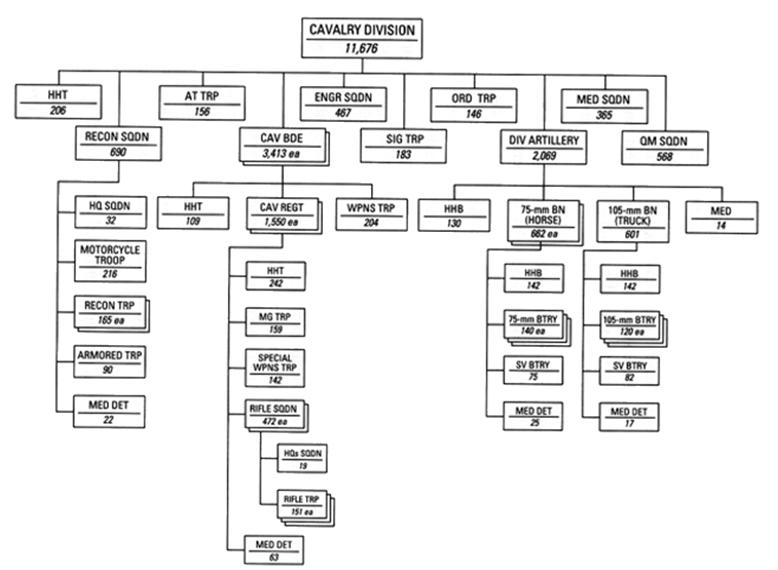
Standard organization chart for a Cavalry Division in November 1940

- Headquarters & Headquarters Troop
- 157th Brigade
  - 313th Cavalry Regiment
  - 314th Cavalry Regiment
- 158th Brigade
  - 315th Cavalry Regiment
  - 316th Cavalry Regiment
- 864th Field Artillery Regiment
- 464th Tank Company
- 64th Signal Troop
- 584th Ordnance Company
- 464th Quartermaster Squadron
- 464th Armored Car Squadron
- 404th Engineer Squadron
- 364th Medical Squadron

== Sources ==
- Lieutenant Colonel (Retired) Steven E. Clay (2010). U.S. Army Order of Battle 1919–1941, Volume 2. The Arms: Cavalry, Field Artillery, and Coast Artillery, 1919–41 (PDF). Fort Leavenworth, KS: Combat Studies Institute Press. Archived from the original (PDF) on 2010-12-02.
- Maneuver and Firepower, The Evolution of Divisions and Separate Brigades, by John B. Wilson, Center of Military History, Washington D.C., 1998
- Cavalry Regiments of the U S Army by James A. Sawicki Wyvern Pubns; June 1985
- Patch King Catalogue via Internet Archive
