= 307th Cavalry Regiment =

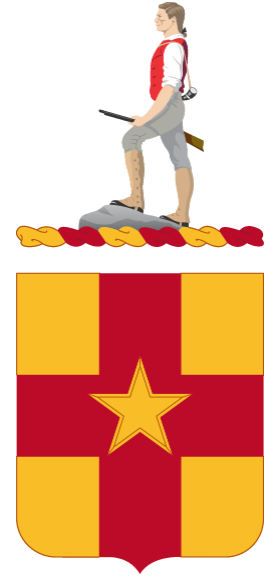
- Active: 1917–1918; 1921–1942
- Country: United States
- Branch: United States Army
- Type: Cavalry
- Part of: 62nd Cavalry Division (1921–1942)
- Garrison/HQ: Richmond, Virginia (1922–1942)
- Motto: Perseverandum (Persevering)

Insignia
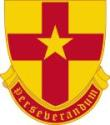
- Distinctive Unit Insignia

The 307th Cavalry Regiment was a cavalry unit of the United States Army during World War I and the interwar period. It was activated in early 1918 but broken up in the middle of the year to form new artillery units. The unit was recreated as a Virginia Organized Reserve unit during the interwar period, and was converted into a tank destroyer battalion shortly after the United States entered World War II.

== History ==
Shortly after the United States entered World War I, the regiment was constituted on 18 May 1917 in the National Army, and organized in February 1918 at Camp Del Rio, Texas. However, it was broken up on 17 August 1918 and its men were used to create the 51st and 55th Field Artillery Regiments, and the 27th Trench Mortar Battery. The 51st and 55th Field Artillery were demobilized on 8 February 1919 at Fort Sill, and the 27th Battery followed two days later at Camp Bowie.

On 15 October 1921, the 51st and 55th Field Artillery and the 27th Battery were reconstituted as the 307th Cavalry, part of the 154th Cavalry Brigade of the new 62nd Cavalry Division in the Organized Reserve. On 6 March 1922, the regiment was initiated with its headquarters in Richmond, Virginia. Its 1st Squadron was located at Richmond and its 2nd Squadron at Norfolk. On 1 July 1929, a 3rd Squadron and Machine Gun Troop at Norfolk were added to the regiment with personnel from the disbanded 154th Machine Gun Squadron.

The 307th usually held its Inactive Training Period meetings at the Parcel Post Building in Richmond, while 3rd Squadron held the meetings at Norfolk's Post Office Building. The regiment conducted regular equestrian training on the horses of Richmond's Deep Run Hunt Club and summer training with the 3rd Cavalry Regiment at Fort Myer and Fort Belvoir. As an alternative summer training program, the 307th held cavalry Citizens' Military Training Camp training at Fort Myer, and its primary ROTC feeder school was the Virginia Military Institute. Its designated mobilization training station was the York Concentration Area in Pennsylvania.

After the Attack on Pearl Harbor resulted in the American entry into World War II, it was converted into the 65th Tank Destroyer Battalion on 30 January 1942. The battalion was disbanded on 11 November 1944.

== Commanders ==
The 307th was commanded by the following officers:

- Colonel Llewellyn W. Oliver (23 January–17 August 1918)
- Lieutenant Colonel James G. Earnest (6 March 1922 – 23 March 1924)
- Colonel Delphe T.E. Casteel (23 March 1924 – 17 August 1926)
- Lieutenant Colonel William H. Clifford (17 August 1926 – 13 January 1934)
- Lieutenant Colonel Robert B.H. Begg (13 January 1934–March 1936)
- Colonel Matthew F. James (March 1936–18 December 1937)
- Lieutenant Colonel John C. Butler (18 December 1937–March 1938)
- Major Max Livingston Jr. (March–May 1938)
- Lieutenant Colonel Robert B.H. Begg (May 1938–July 1940)
- Lieutenant Colonel Max Livingston Jr. (July 1940–after January 1941)

== Heraldry ==
The 307th's distinctive unit insignia was approved on 11 January 1927, and its coat of arms was approved on the next day. Both were rescinded on 17 February 1959. The distinctive unit insignia included a 1 1/8 in (2.86 cm) gold colored metal and enamel device, which consisted of a shield with a red cross with a yellow star in the center, and a red and gold scroll below the shield, which was inscribed with the regimental motto, "Perseverandum". The shield symbolized the United States Cavalry, the cross, similar to that on the colonial seal of Virginia, represented the unit's Virginia assignment, the red symbolized its World War I field artillery service, and the star represented service in Texas. The motto was Latin for "Persevering", and was based on the motto on the reverse of the Great Seal of Virginia. The 307th's coat of arms was similar to the distinctive unit insignia except that it added the Organized Reserve crest, a Minuteman, and omitted the motto.
