= 316th Cavalry Regiment =

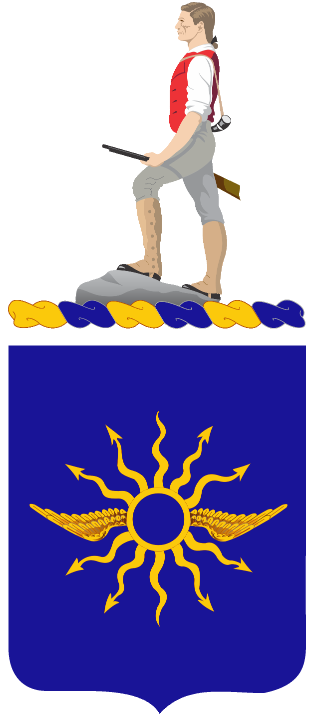
- Coat of Arms of the 316th Cavalry Regiment
- Active: 1922–1942
- Country: United States
- Branch: United States Army
- Type: Cavalry
- Part of: 64th Cavalry Division (1921–1942)
- Garrison/HQ: Providence (1940–1941)
- Mottos: "Pata Concita Fulmnt Nati" (The Fatherland having been aroused, its sons thunder forth)

Insignia
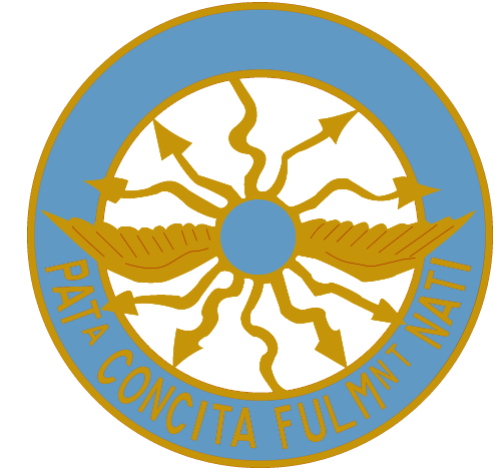
- Distinctive Unit Insignia

The 316th Cavalry Regiment was a cavalry unit of the United States Army during the interwar period. The unit was activated as a Rhode Island, Connecticut, Vermont, and New Hampshire Organized Reserve unit during the interwar period. It was converted into a signal aircraft warning regiment after the United States entered World War II.

== History ==
The 316th was constituted on 15 October 1921 in the Organized Reserves, part of the 64th Cavalry Division's 158th Cavalry Brigade in the Fifth Corps Area. On 14 November, it was transferred to the First Corps Area. It was initiated (activated) on 6 July 1922 with its headquarters at Northfield, Vermont, 1st Squadron at Burlington, Vermont, and 2nd Squadron at Manchester, New Hampshire. On 15 April 1926, the headquarters relocated to Hartford, Connecticut, the 1st Squadron to Waterbury, Connecticut, and the 2nd Squadron to New Haven, Connecticut. At the time, the regiment's units were scattered over Connecticut, western Massachusetts, and northern Vermont and New Hampshire. A new 3rd Squadron at Montpelier, Vermont was added to the regiment on 1 July 1929. For organization, administration, and training, the 316th was attached to the 76th Division on 17 October 1929 until its relief from the 76th and transfer to the 94th Division on 27 January 1930.

The 3rd Squadron and other 316th units in Vermont usually held inactive training period meetings at the Meade Building in Rutland. Connecticut units held the meetings at Harford's University Club and the A Troop Armory in New Haven, and Rhode Island units held them at Providence's Armory of Mounted Commands. In the fall or winter, Vermont and New Hampshire units conducted annual contact camps at Norwich University. The 316th conducted summer training at Fort Ethan Allen with the 1st Squadron, 3rd Cavalry Regiment. As an alternate form of training, it provided cavalry training to civilians through the Citizens' Military Training Camp at Fort Ethan Allen. The regiment's primary ROTC feeder school was Norwich University. Around January 1940, the regimental headquarters and 2nd Squadron moved to Providence, Rhode Island, and the 1st Squadron to Hartford. The 316th was converted into the 541st Signal Aircraft Warning Regiment on 30 January 1942, after the United States entered World War II. The regiment was disbanded on 11 November 1944.

== Commanders ==
The 316th was commanded by the following officers:

- 1st Lieutenant Martin H. Gleason (6 July–6 August 1922)
- Major Walter V. Longwell (6 August–September 1922)
- 1st Lieutenant Martin H. Gleason (September–December 1922)
- Colonel Frank B. Edwards (April 1924–15 April 1926)
- Colonel Clifford L. Cheney (30 April 1926–27 January 1930)
- Colonel John H.K. Davis (27 January 1930–29 December 1934)
- Lieutenant Colonel Joseph T. Marinan (30 December 1934–18 January 1940
- Lieutenant Colonel Harold C. Thomas (18 January–August 1940)

== Heraldry ==
The regiment's coat of arms and distinctive unit insignia were both approved on 11 March 1927. The distinctive unit insignia consisted of the winged thunderbolt symbol of Tallmadge's Dragoons, a Connecticut Revolutionary War unit. The thunderbolt was located inside an azure bezant and annulet with the unit's motto, "Pata Concita Fulmnt Nati" (The Fatherland having been aroused, its sons thunder forth), which was the motto of Tallmadge's Dragoons. The coat of arms consisted of a blue shield with the winged thunderbolt in the center. The blue copied the color of one of the Tallmadge's Dragoons flags, and the Organized Reserve's Minuteman crest was located above the shield.
