= 348th Cavalry Regiment =

- Active: 1973–1995
- Country: United States
- Branch: United States Army
- Type: Reconnaissance (Parent Regiment under United States Army Regimental System)
- Part of: 48th Infantry Brigade (Troop E)
- Garrison/HQ: Griffin, Georgia (Troop E)

The 348th Cavalry Regiment was a United States Army cavalry regiment, represented in the Georgia Army National Guard by Troop E, 348th Cavalry, headquartered at Griffin, Georgia, part of the 48th Infantry Brigade. It was constituted in 1973 after Troop E was reflagged from a unit of the 196th Cavalry. In 1995, Troop E was reflagged as Troop E, 108th Cavalry.

== History ==
The 348th Cavalry was constituted on 23 November 1973 as a Combat Arms Regimental System (CARS) parent regiment in the Georgia Army National Guard. It was organized on 1 December 1973 to consist of Troop E, an element of the 48th Infantry Brigade. Troop E had become Troop C, 1st Squadron, 196th Cavalry on 1 January 1968 and was previously Headquarters and Headquarters Troop, 1st Squadron, 748th Cavalry. It carried on the lineage of Griffin's Spalding Grays and Griffin Rifles units. Troop E served as the 48th Brigade's reconnaissance unit.

On 1 June 1989, the 348th was withdrawn from CARS and reorganized with headquarters at Griffin under the United States Army Regimental System (USARS). On 30 November 1990, along with the rest of the 48th Brigade, Troop E was ordered into active Federal service at Griffin. With the brigade, the troop trained at the Fort Irwin National Training Center for combat in the Gulf War, but the 48th was not certified combat ready until the day the ground war ended, 28 February 1991, and thus was not deployed. It was released from active duty on 10 April and reverted to state control. On 1 January 1994, it was reorganized, redesignated, and consolidated as Troop E, part of the 48th Infantry Brigade. On 2 September 1995, Troop E was reflagged as Troop E of the newly constituted 108th Cavalry. The regiment was not authorized a coat of arms or a distinctive unit insignia.
