= 306th Armored Cavalry Regiment =

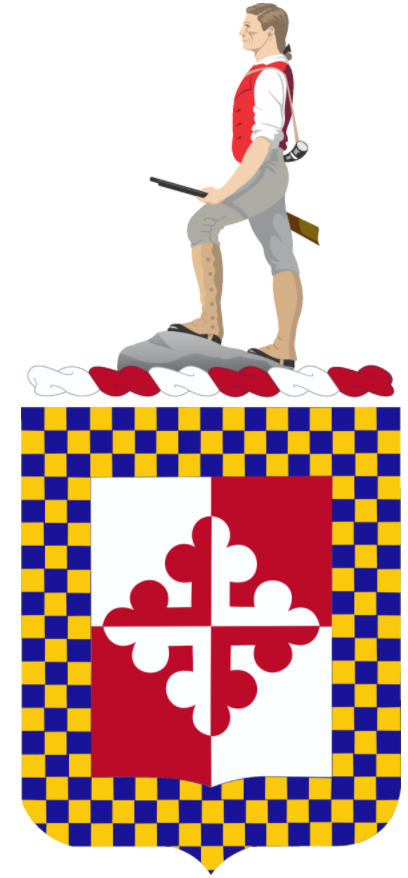
- Coat of Arms of the 306th Cavalry Regiment
- Active: February–August 1918; 1921–1942; 1949–1959
- Country: United States
- Branch: United States Army
- Type: Cavalry
- Part of: 62nd Cavalry Division (1921–1942)
- Garrison/HQ: Washington, D.C. (1949–1959)
- Motto(s): Forward
- Anniversaries: 6 February

Commanders
- Notable commanders: John Boynton Philip Clayton Hill

Insignia
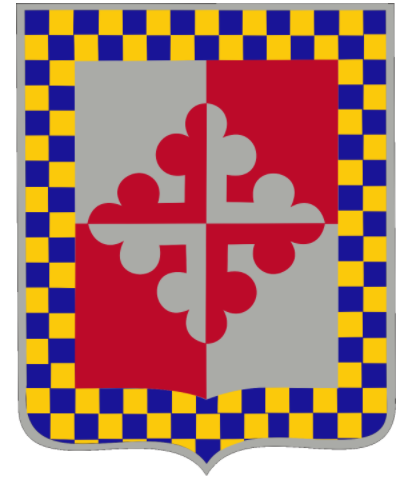
- Distinctive Unit Insignia

The 306th Armored Cavalry Regiment (306th ACR) was a District of Columbia-based reconnaissance unit of the United States Army Organized Reserve Corps that briefly existed after World War II. The 306th ACR later became a group before being inactivated in 1959.

It traced its history back to the 306th Cavalry Regiment, a reserve unit that existed during World War I and the interwar period. It was activated in early 1918 but broken up in the middle of the year to form new artillery units. The unit was recreated as a Maryland Organized Reserve unit during the interwar period, and was converted into a signal aircraft warning regiment after the United States entered World War II.

== History ==
The 306th Cavalry was constituted on 18 May 1917 in the National Army, shortly after the United States entered World War I, and organized on 6 February 1918 at Fort Clark, Texas. The regiment was broken up on 20 August 1918 and its elements used to form the 49th and 50th Field Artillery Regiments and the 17th Trench Mortar Battery. All three artillery units were demobilized on 8 February 1919 at Fort Sill, Oklahoma.

On 15 October 1921, the 49th and 50th Field Artillery and the 17th Trench Mortar Battery were reconstituted in the Organized Reserve as the 306th Cavalry Regiment, part of the 62nd Cavalry Division in the Third Corps Area. It became part of the division's 153rd Cavalry Brigade. The regiment was initiated (activated) with headquarters at Baltimore, 1st Squadron at Baltimore, and 2nd Squadron at Washington, D.C. Its commander from 1921 to 1937, John Boynton Philip Clayton Hill, was a Maryland politician and congressman. On 1 July 1929, it became a three-squadron regiment, with the new 3rd Squadron being activated at Baltimore. A machine gun troop was simultaneously added to the regiment at D.C., both new units being composed of men from the 153rd Machine Gun Squadron. Troop F, 306th Cavalry eventually reached full strength in enlisted men, one of the few reserve units to do so during the interwar period.

The 306th's headquarters, 1st, and 3rd Squadrons usually held their inactive training period meetings at the Post Office Building in Baltimore, while the 2nd Squadron and Machine Group held the meetings at the Munitions Building in D.C. It conducted regular equestrian training on the horses of the 3rd Cavalry Regiment at Fort Myer and the 6th Field Artillery at Fort Hoyle and often participated as a mounted unit in D.C.'s Army Day parade. The regiment conducted summer training at Fort Myer and Fort Belvoir with the 3rd Cavalry Regiment. As an alternate form of training, the 306th provided basic cavalry military instruction to civilians under the Citizens' Military Training Camp program at Fort Myer. The regiment's primary ROTC feeder school was the Virginia Military Institute, and its designated mobilization training station was the York Concentration Area in Pennsylvania. It celebrated its organization day on 6 February, the anniversary of its World War I organization.

After the United States entered World War II, it was converted into the 543rd Signal Aircraft Warning Regiment on 30 January 1942. Postwar, on 27 December 1948, the regiment was converted and redesignated the 306th Armored Cavalry Regiment. Its headquarters and headquarters company were activated on 9 February 1949 at Washington, D.C. On 25 May 1950, the regiment was redesignated the 306th Armored Cavalry Group. Later that year, after the beginning of the Korean War, the group conducted training with other Reserve and National Guard units at Fort Hood. By 1955, it dropped the cavalry designation. The regiment spent the 1955 summer training period at Fort Knox. It was inactivated at Washington, D.C. on 15 May 1959.

== Commanders ==
The 306th was commanded by the following officers:

- Colonel George O. Cress (26 January–6 August 1918)
- Colonel John Boynton Philip Clayton Hill (November 1921–18 December 1937)
- Lieutenant Colonel William H. Skinner (18 December 1937–15 January 1938)
- Colonel Matthew F. James (15 January 1938–March 1941)

== Heraldry ==
The 306th's distinctive unit insignia was approved on 15 August 1924 and its coat of arms on 6 September 1928. The distinctive unit insignia included a 1 1/8 in (2.86 cm) silver colored metal and enamel device, which consisted of a red and gray shield with a modified Lord Baltimore Cross bordered by yellow and blue squares. The Lord Baltimore cross symbolized the regiment's location in the Maryland–Washington, D.C. area during the interwar period, yellow represented cavalry, and blue represented Federal service. The regimental coat of arms was of a similar design to the distinctive unit insignia but included the Organized Reserve's Minuteman crest above the shield and depicted a red and white Lord Baltimore Cross instead of the distinctive unit insignia's red and gray.
