= 314th Armored Cavalry Regiment =

- Active: 1949–1950
- Country: United States
- Branch: United States Army
- Type: Cavalry
- Role: Reconnaissance
- Garrison/HQ: Nashville, Tennessee

The 314th Armored Cavalry Regiment (314th ACR) was a Tennessee-based reconnaissance unit of the United States Army Organized Reserve Corps, which briefly existed after World War II. It was constituted in 1948, partially organized from existing units in 1949, and inactivated in 1950.

== History ==
The 314th Armored Cavalry was constituted on 26 November 1948 in the Organized Reserve Corps, and partially organized on 24 March 1949 from existing units. Its headquarters and headquarters company (HHC) was redesignated from the headquarters and headquarters troop (HHT) of the 314th Cavalry Group, Mechanized, which had been constituted on 16 November 1944 as the Headquarters and Headquarters Battery of the 123rd Antiaircraft Artillery Group, activated on 28 November at Camp Malakole, Hawaii. It was inactivated there on 31 December 1945 and converted and redesignated as the HHT of the 314th Cavalry Group, Mechanized on 16 July 1947. The 314th's HHT was activated at Nashville on 1 August, commanded by Colonel Raymond E. Vickery. On 11 November, the 314th Cavalry received its colors from Brigadier General Cornelius E. Ryan after the Nashville Armistice Day parade along with other reserve units.

The 1st Battalion was redesignated from the 322nd Mechanized Cavalry Reconnaissance Squadron, constituted on 9 May 1947 in the Organized Reserves and activated in Memphis on 30 May. The regiment's HHC held its weekly meetings at Nashville's Organized Reserve Corps Armory. The regiment's HHC and 1st Battalion inactivated on 31 December 1950, at Nashville and Memphis, respectively. The 314th was disbanded on 10 March 1952. The 314th ACR did not inherit the lineage of the prewar 314th Cavalry Regiment, and was not authorized a coat of arms or distinctive unit insignia.
