= John W. Gulick =

United States Army general (1874–1939)

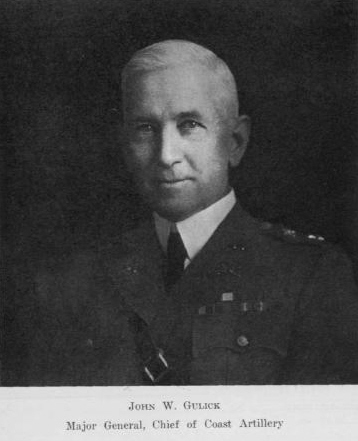
- Photograph of Gulick from the 1930 Coast Artillery Journal
- Born: November 8, 1874; Goldsboro, North Carolina, US
- Died: August 18, 1939 (aged 64); Portland, Maine, US
- Burial place: Arlington National Cemetery
- Spouse: Florence McMullan (m. 1905)
- Children: 2
- Military career
- Branch: United States Army
- Service years: 1894–1898 (Militia); 1898–1938 (Army)
- Rank: Major general
- Unit: United States Army Coast Artillery Corps
- Commands: 21st Coast Artillery Company; Army Post, Gubat, Philippines; Coast Artillery Battalion, Fort Oglethorpe; Department of Artillery and Land Defense, US Army Artillery School; Sandy Hook, New Jersey; Chief of Coast Artillery; Brooklyn Port of Embarkation; Provisional Coast Artillery Brigade, Panama; Second Coast Artillery District; Third Coast Artillery District
- Conflicts: Spanish–American War; Philippine–American War; Pancho Villa Expedition; World War I
- Awards: Army Distinguished Service Medal; Legion of Honor (Officer) (France).

John W. Gulick (November 8, 1874 – August 18, 1939) was an American career officer in the United States Army. He attained the rank of major general, and was most notable for his service as Chief of the Coast Artillery Corps.

A native of Goldsboro, North Carolina, he was educated in Goldsboro and embarked on a career in the North Carolina National Guard in 1894. After his unit was federalized for service in the Spanish–American War, Gulick served in Florida and Cuba before obtaining an Artillery commission in the regular army and assignment to the 47th U.S. Volunteer Infantry Regiment. After service Philippine–American War, Gulick served with the Coast Artillery Corps in a series of assignments of increasing rank and responsibility, including service on the Mexican border during the Pancho Villa Expedition.

During World War I, Gulick served as chief of staff of the 40th Division, and then First Army Artillery, for which he received the Army Distinguished Service Medal and the French Legion of Honor (Officer). After the war he graduated from the Army War College and served as chief of staff at the Militia Bureau. In 1926, Gulick was promoted to major general as the Chief of Coast Artillery, and he served until 1934. From 1934 until his 1938 retirement, he served in additional command positions, including the Brooklyn, New York Port of Embarkation and the Second and Third Coast Artillery Districts.

In retirement, Gulick was a resident of Cape Cottage, South Portland, Maine. He died in Portland, Maine, on August 18, 1939, and was buried at Arlington National Cemetery.

== Early life ==
John Wiley Gulick was born in Goldsboro, North Carolina, on November 8, 1874, the son of James Wharton Gulick and Susan Holland (Green) Gulick. He was educated in the public schools of Goldsboro, and attended courses in engineering at several universities prior to embarking on a full-time military career. In 1894, Gulick joined the North Carolina National Guard as a private. He advanced through the ranks to first sergeant, and then received his commission as a first lieutenant.

== Spanish–American War ==
At the start of the Spanish–American War, Gulick's National Guard unit was federalized, and he served in Florida and Cuba, including assignment as quartermaster and ordnance officer for 1st Brigade, 2nd Division, Seventh Army Corps. In 1899, Gulick was commissioned as a first lieutenant in the 47th U.S. Volunteer Infantry Regiment. He was soon promoted to captain, and his regiment served in the Philippines during the Philippine–American War. Gulick took part in several battles and skirmishes, commanded the 21st Coast Artillery Company and the Army post at Gubat, and was promoted to the brevet rank of major for heroism in action near Bulusan on August 10, 1900.

== Post-war ==
Gulick returned to the United States in July 1901, was mustered out of the volunteer forces, and returned to the regular army at his permanent rank of first lieutenant. From 1901 to 1903 he served at Coast Artillery posts in Charleston, South Carolina, and Havana and Cienfuegos, Cuba. From 1903 to 1904 he served at the headquarters of the Coast Artillery District of Portland, Maine.

In August 1904, Gulick attended the Coast Artillery Officer Course at the Fort Monroe Artillery school. After his 1905 graduation, he was retained as an instructor, and he remained on the faculty until 1911. In 1906, Gulick was promoted to permanent captain.

== Service in Chile ==
In November 1911, Gulick was assigned as military attaché in Chile, and a special act of Congress enabled him to serve as an instructor and advisor on coastal defenses as a major in the Chilean army. He served in this position until June, 1915, and upon his return to the United States, Gulick was assigned to Fort Monroe as commander of a Coast Artillery battery and member of the Coast Artillery Board, the panel which considered and approved recommendations on topics ranging from training requirements to weapons procurement.

== Pancho Villa Expedition ==
In April 1916, Gulick was assigned to Fort Oglethorpe, Georgia, as commander of a Coast Artillery battalion, and also assisted in the organization and operation of an officers' training camp created as part of the pre-World War I Preparedness Movement. In May he was ordered to El Paso, Texas with two batteries from his battalion, and assigned to security duty on the Mexican border during the Pancho Villa Expedition.

Gulick was promoted to major in July 1916 and assigned to the 5th Provisional Coast Artillery Regiment, with duty in Del Rio, Texas. In August he returned to Fort Monroe as director of the Artillery School's Department of Artillery and Land Defense, and served until June 1917.

== World War I ==
In August 1917, Gulick was promoted to lieutenant colonel and assigned to the staff of the Army War College. In May 1918, he was promoted to temporary colonel and assigned as chief of staff for the 40th Division in anticipation of its service in France during World War I. He joined the division at Camp Kearny, California, for the completion of its organization and training, and in July he was with the organization as it embarked for travel to France.

Upon arrival in France, Gulick was reassigned as chief of staff for First Army Artillery, and he served in this position until the end of the war. He took part in the St. Mihiel and Meuse-Argonne offensives, and was a recipient of the Army Distinguished Service Medal and the French Legion of Honor (Officer).

== Post-World War I ==
After World War I, Gulick returned to his permanent rank of lieutenant colonel, and served at the War Department in the War Plans Division of the Army staff. From 1924 to 1925 he was a student at the Army War College. After his graduation, he served at the Fort Hancock, New Jersey, proving ground as executive officer, and then commander of the coast artillery defenses at Sandy Hook. In 1926, when he was promoted to permanent colonel and assigned as chief of staff at the Militia Bureau.

== Chief of Coast Artillery ==
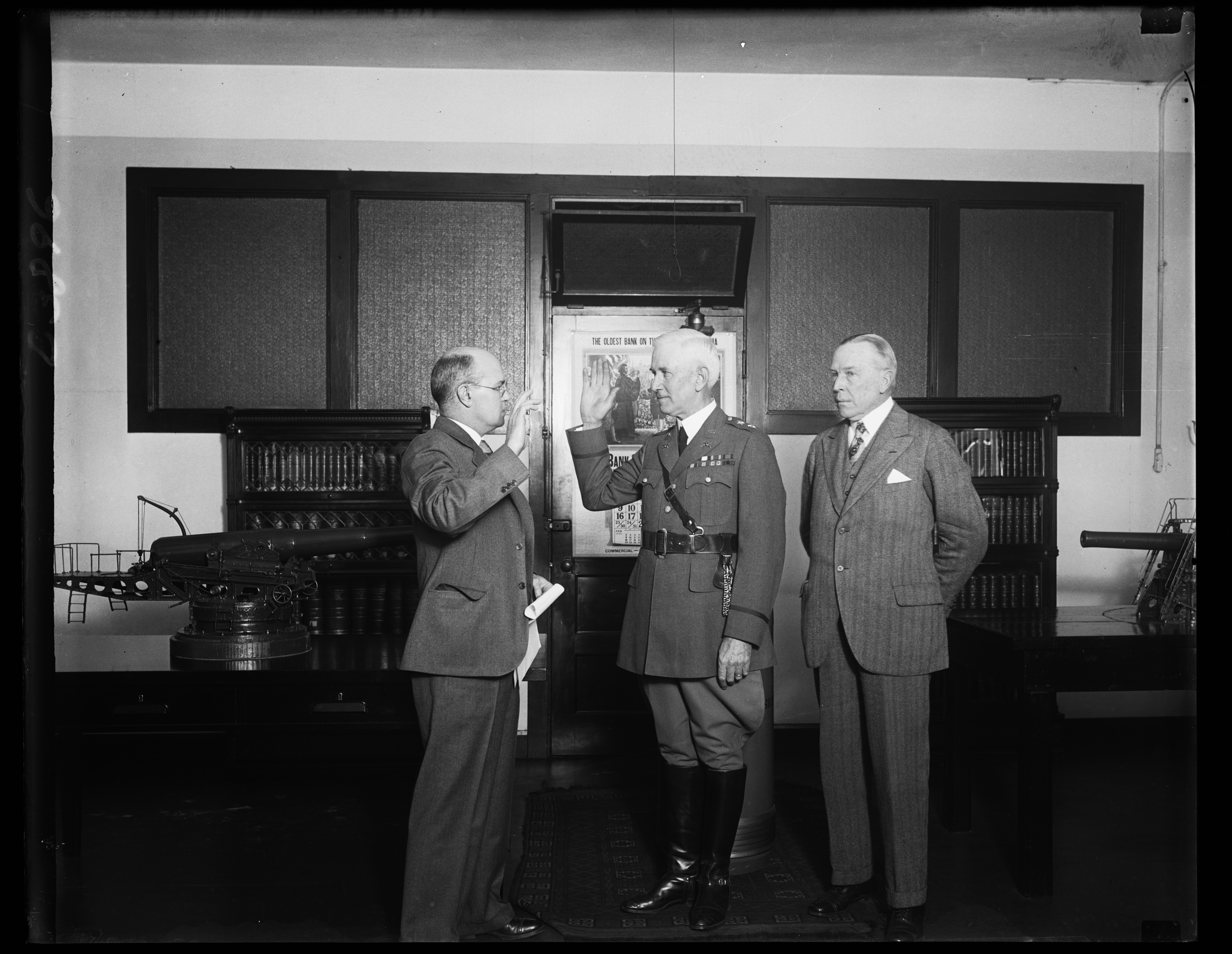
Gulick being sworn in as Chief of Coast Artillery. His predecessor Andrew Hero Jr. is at right.

In 1930, Gulick was promoted to temporary major general and assigned as the Chief of the Coast Artillery Corps. Gulick's tenure was marked by efforts to modernize the Coast Artillery, including expansion of its anti-aircraft artillery mission as the military use of airplanes continued to grow. In addition, Gulick called upon his prior experience at the Militia Bureau in promoting greater cooperation between the Army Reserve, National Guard, and regular army. Gulick also served as president of the Coast Artillery Association, which promoted the professional development of Coast Artillery soldiers and attempted to enhance the public's awareness of the Coast Artillery Corps mission.

In 1934, Gulick reverted to the permanent rank of brigadier general and was assigned as commander of the Brooklyn Port of Embarkation. He was then assigned to the Panama Canal Department as commander of its Provisional Coast Artillery Brigade. After completing this assignment, he was named commander of the Second Coast Artillery District with headquarters in New York City, where he served from 1936 to 1937. In 1937 he was assigned to command the Third Coast Artillery District, based at Fort Monroe. He was then assigned Third Corps Area commander from February 1938 to April 1938. He retired upon reaching the mandatory retirement age of 64 in November 1938.

== Retirement and death ==
After retiring, Gulick was a resident of Cape Cottage, South Portland, Maine. He died in Portland, Maine, on August 18, 1939 and was buried at Arlington National Cemetery, Section 3 Site 4020-C N.

== Family ==
On July 3, 1905, Gulick married Florence McMullan in Glen Cove, Maine. They were the parents of a daughter, Jean, and a son, John McMullan Gulick (1914–1967). John M. Gulick was a United States Air Force officer and attained the rank of lieutenant colonel.

== Legacy ==
Gulick Drive, which was constructed atop a seawall built at Fort Monroe in 1934, is named for John W. Gulick.

Fort Gulick, a military reservation in Panama was created in 1941 and named for John W. Gulick. It was turned over to the government of Panama in 1984 and renamed Fort Espinar. During its service as a US facility, Fort Gulick was best known as the home of the School of the Americas.

== Sources ==
=== Magazines ===
- Bennett, E. E. (March 1934). "Notes of the Coast Artillery: General Gulick Resigns as President of the United States Coast Artillery Association" (PDF). The Coast Artillery Journal. Washington, DC: U.S. Army Coast Artillery Corps.
- Giffin, Stewart S. (May 1930). "Major General John W. Gulick, Chief of Coast Artillery" (PDF). The Coast Artillery Journal. Washington, DC: U.S. Army Coast Artillery Corps. Archived (PDF) from the original on March 2, 2017.

=== Newspapers ===
- "Lieut. J. W. Gulick Weds". The News & Observer. Raleigh, NC. July 21, 1905 – via Newspapers.com.
- "Gen. John W. Gulick, Retired, Dies at 64". The New York Times. New York, NY. August 19, 1939.
- "Gen. John W. Gulick, Ex-Commandant at Ft. Monroe, Passes". Daily Press. Newport News, VA. Associated Press. August 19, 1939 – via Newspapers.com.
- Sprock, Phyllis (June 6, 2011). "Street names on Fort Monroe reveal post's past". Peninsula Warrior. Norfolk, VA.

=== Books ===
- The Florida Times-Union (1898). Souvenir of Camp Cuba Libre. Jacksonville, FL: DaCosta Printing Company.
- Johnson, Suzanne P. (1999). American Legacy in Panama. Fort Clayton, Panama: U.S. Army Garrison – Panama.

=== Internet ===
- "Burial Record, John W. Gulick". Arlington National Cemetery. Washington, DC: United States Department of the Army. Archived from the original on June 26, 2015.
- "Burial Record, John M. Gulick". Arlington National Cemetery. Washington, DC: United States Department of the Army. Archived from the original on June 26, 2015.
