= 154th Division =

154th Division or 154th Infantry Division may refer to:

- 154th Division (People's Republic of China)
- 154th Infantry Division (Wehrmacht), Germany
- 154th Infantry Division "Murge", Italy
- 154th Division (Imperial Japanese Army)
- 154th Rifle Division, Soviet Union

== See also ==
- List of military divisions by number
- 154th Brigade (disambiguation)
- 154th Regiment (disambiguation)
- 154th (disambiguation)
