= 154th Illinois Infantry Regiment =

154th Regiment Illinois Volunteer Infantry
- Illinois state flag
- Active: February 21, 1865, to September 18, 1865
- Country: United States
- Allegiance: Union
- Branch: Infantry

The 154th Regiment Illinois Volunteer Infantry was an infantry regiment that served in the Union Army during the American Civil War.

== Service ==
The 154th Illinois Infantry was organized at Camp Butler, Illinois, and mustered into Federal service on February 21, 1865, for a one-year enlistment.

Just after they were mustered, the regiment moved to Louisville, Kentucky, and arrived at Nashville, Tennessee, on February 27. They remained there until March 2 due to floods. They would later move to Murfreesboro, but would later suffer from exposure to cold rains, leading to sickness and many deaths due to severe exposure.

The regiment would remain in Murfreesboro, conducting drill, picket, and guard duties until May 13, when they would move to Tullahoma on May 15, remaining there until June 11, and then returning to Murfreesboro to conduct its previous assignment.

The regiment mustered out on September 18, 1865, at Camp Butler, Illinois

== Total strength and casualties ==
The regiment suffered 76 enlisted men who died of disease for a total of 76 fatalities.

== Commanders ==
- Colonel Mclain F. Wood - died August 6, 1865.
- Lieutenant Colonel Francis Swanwick - mustered out with the regiment.

== See also ==
- List of Illinois Civil War Units
- Illinois in the American Civil War
