= 305th Armored Cavalry Regiment =

- Active: 1949–1951
- Country: United States
- Branch: United States Army
- Type: Cavalry
- Role: Reconnaissance
- Garrison/HQ: Indianapolis

The 305th Armored Cavalry Regiment (305th ACR) was an Indiana-based reconnaissance unit of the United States Army Organized Reserve Corps, which briefly existed after World War II.

== History ==
The 305th Armored Cavalry was constituted on 21 October 1948 in the Organized Reserve Corps, and partially organized from existing units on 1 May 1949. Its headquarters and headquarters company was redesignated from the headquarters and headquarters troop of the 305th Cavalry Group, Mechanized, which had been constituted on 29 October 1946 in the Organized Reserve and activated on 14 November of that year in Indianapolis. Then-Mayor of Indianapolis Robert Tyndall spoke at the 305th Cavalry Group's activation ceremony. The group's first commander was Lieutenant Colonel Lowell S. Love.

The headquarters and headquarters company was inactivated on 14 February 1951 at Indianapolis, and the regiment was disbanded on 10 March 1952. The 305th ACR did not inherit the lineage of the prewar 305th Cavalry Regiment, and was not authorized a coat of arms or distinctive unit insignia.
