= 154th Regiment =

154th Regiment may refer to:

- 154th Illinois Volunteer Infantry Regiment, a unit of the Union (North) Army during the American Civil War
- 154th Indiana Infantry Regiment, a unit of the Union (North) Army during the American Civil War
- 154th Ohio Infantry, a unit of the Union (North) Army during the American Civil War
- 154th Tennessee Infantry Regiment, a unit of the Confederate States (South) Army during the American Civil War
- 154th Infantry Regiment ("Third Arkansas"), a regiment of the United States Army during World War I
- 154th Regiment Royal Armoured Corps, a short-lived regiment of the British Army during World War II
- 154 (Scottish) Regiment RLC, a unit of the United Kingdom Territorial Army, formed in 1967

== See also ==
- 154th Brigade (disambiguation)
- 154th Division (disambiguation)
