= 748th Cavalry Regiment =

- Active: 1963–1968
- Country: United States
- Branch: United States Army
- Type: Reconnaissance (Parent Regiment under Combat Arms Regimental System)
- Part of: 48th Armored Division (1st Squadron)
- Garrison/HQ: Griffin, Georgia (1st Squadron)

The 748th Cavalry Regiment was a United States Army cavalry regiment, represented in the Georgia Army National Guard by 1st Squadron, 748th Cavalry, headquartered at Griffin, Georgia, part of the 48th Armored Division. It was broken up in 1968 when the division was inactivated.

== History ==
The 748th Cavalry was reorganized and redesignated from the 1st Reconnaissance Squadron, 108th Armor, on 16 April 1963. The 1st Reconnaissance Squadron was constituted in the Georgia Army National Guard as the 48th Reconnaissance Battalion of the 48th Armored Division, and organized on 1 November 1955 with headquarters and headquarters company (HHC) at Jackson, Company A at LaGrange, Georgia, Company B at Newnan, Company C at Griffin, and Company D at Marietta. The reconnaissance battalion was reorganized and redesignated as the 1st Reconnaissance Squadron, 108th Armor, on 1 July 1959, and its headquarters moved to Newnan. The 748th was a parent regiment under the Combat Arms Regimental System and was represented by 1st Squadron, part of the 48th Armored Division.

1st Squadron's Griffin-based Headquarters and Headquarters Troop was redesignated from Troop C of the 1st Reconnaissance Squadron. It had been redesignated Troop C on 1 July 1959 and was previously Company C of the 48th Reconnaissance Battalion. The troop carried on the lineage of the Spalding Grays and Griffin Rifles, historical militia units. Jackson-based Troop A was redesignated from Troop A of the 1st Reconnaissance Squadron, and had been redesignated Troop A on 1 July 1959. It was previously the Headquarters, Headquarters, and Service Company of the 48th Reconnaissance Battalion, and carried the lineage of Company A, 121st Infantry. Troop B, based at Douglasville, was redesignated from the 1st Reconnaissance Squadron's Troop B, and was previously Company D of the 122nd Armored Infantry Battalion.

Troop C was redesignated from HHT of the 1st Reconnaissance Squadron at Newnan, and was previously Company B of the 48th Reconnaissance Battalion. Troop D (Air) was redesignated from Company C of the 110th Signal Battalion at Savannah. It was previously Battery A of the 230th Armored Field Artillery Battalion. Troops A and D were entitled to campaign streamers for their service in the 31st Infantry Division during World War I (Streamer without inscription) and with the 30th Infantry Division in World War II (Normandy, Northern France, Rhineland, and Central Europe).

Guardsmen of Troop B, 1st Reconnaissance Squadron, 108th Cavalry maneuver with an M41 Walker Bulldog tank, Fort Stewart, July 1961

For the duration of its existence, the 1st Squadron conducted annual summer training alongside the division at Fort Stewart. On 1 January 1968, when the 48th Armored was inactivated, the 1st Squadron was broken up. HHT and Troop C consolidated as Troop C, 1st Squadron, 196th Cavalry. Troop A became Company D of the 878th Engineer Battalion; Troop B consolidated with HHC, 1st Battalion, 108th Armor; and Troop D (Air) became the Service Company of the 214th Artillery's 2nd Battalion. The 748th was never authorized a distinctive unit insignia or coat of arms.
