= 313th Cavalry Regiment =

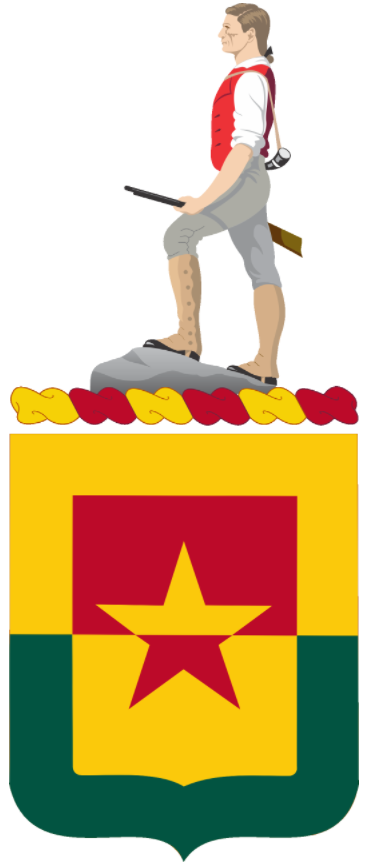
- Coat of Arms of the 313th Cavalry Regiment
- Active: March–August 1918; 1922–1942
- Country: United States
- Branch: United States Army
- Type: Cavalry
- Part of: 64th Cavalry Division (1921–1942)
- Garrison/HQ: Culver, Indiana (1937–1941)
- Motto: "We Also Serve"

Insignia
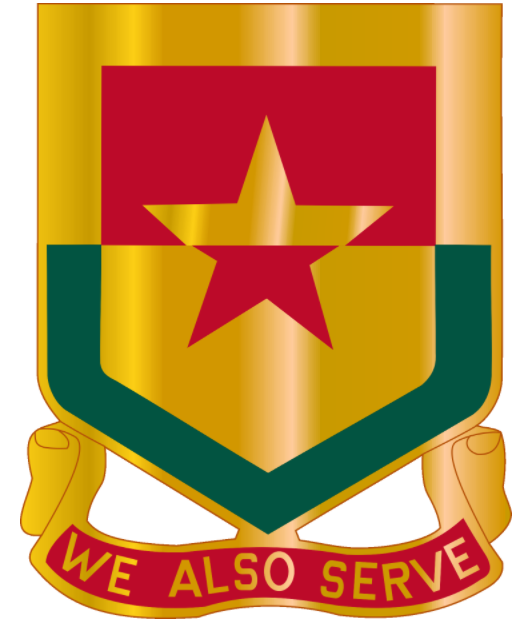
- Distinctive Unit Insignia

The 313th Cavalry Regiment was a cavalry unit of the United States Army during World War I and the interwar period. It was activated in early 1918 but broken up later that year to form new artillery units. The unit was recreated as a Kentucky Organized Reserve unit during the interwar period and was later transferred to Indiana. It was disbanded after the United States entered World War II.

== History ==
Shortly after the United States entered World War I, the regiment was constituted in the National Army on 18 May 1917, and organized on 28 March 1918 at Del Rio, Texas. It was broken up on 23 August 1918 into the 69th and 70th Field Artillery Regiments and the 26th Trench Mortar Battery. All three artillery units were demobilized on 21 December at Camp Knox.

On 15 October 1921, the 69th and 70th Field Artillery and the 26th Trench Mortar Battery were reconstituted in the Organized Reserve as the 313th Cavalry Regiment, part of the 64th Cavalry Division in the Fifth Corps Area. The 313th was initiated (activated) in January 1922 with regimental headquarters at Earlington, Kentucky, 1st Squadron at Paducah, Kentucky, and 2nd Squadron at Morganfield, Kentucky. The regiment joined the division's 157th Cavalry Brigade. On 15 April 1925, the regimental headquarters was relocated to Louisville, Kentucky, the 1st Squadron to Central City, Kentucky, and the 2nd Squadron to Madisonville, Kentucky. It was reorganized as a three-squadron regiment on 1 July 1929 and all units relocated to Louisville on 9 July 1931. On 5 April 1937, the regimental headquarters and 1st Squadron moved to Culver, Indiana, 2nd Squadron and Machine Gun Troop to Indianapolis, and 3rd Squadron to Vincennes, Indiana.

The regiment conducted summer training at Camp Knox and Fort Oglethorpe with the 6th Cavalry Regiment. The 313th's primary ROTC feeder school was the Culver Military Academy, where it held annual contact camps. After the United States entered World War II, the regiment was disbanded on 18 October 1943, after its personnel were called up for active duty.

== Commanders ==
The 313th was commanded by the following officers:

- Colonel Kenzie W. Walker (28 March–23 August 1918)
- Colonel Robert Rossow (January 1922–June 1931)
- Major Louis S.N. Phillipp (June 1933–June 1934)
- Colonel Arthur C. Earnshaw (June 1935–July 1937)
- Colonel Robert Rossow (September 1939–June 1940)

== Heraldry ==
The 313th's coat of arms was approved on 12 October 1925 and its distinctive unit insignia was approved on 5 August 1927. Both were rescinded on 2 February 1959. The distinctive unit insignia included a 1 1/8 in (2.86 cm) gold colored metal and enamel device, which consisted of shield with a half yellow, half green border. The center of the shield included a counterchanged red and yellow star. The colors of the shield symbolized the regiment's service as cavalry, artillery, and then cavalry. The star represented Texas, where it was organized, and the green and yellow border represented its service on the southwestern border. The regimental motto, "We Also Serve", was attached to the bottom of the distinctive unit insignia. The regimental coat of arms was of a similar design to the distinctive unit insignia but included the Organized Reserve's Minuteman crest above the shield and omitted the motto.
