= 314th Cavalry Regiment =

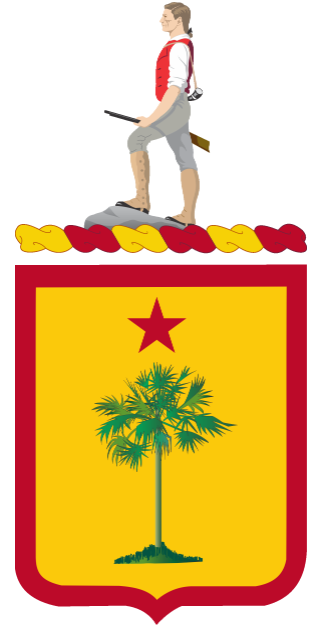
- Coat of Arms of the 314th Cavalry Regiment
- Active: April–October 1918; 1922–1942
- Country: United States
- Branch: United States Army
- Type: Cavalry
- Part of: 64th Cavalry Division (1921–1942)
- Garrison/HQ: Dayton, Ohio (1939–1941)
- Mottos: "Unity and Speed"

Commanders
- Notable commanders: Cornelius C. Smith

Insignia
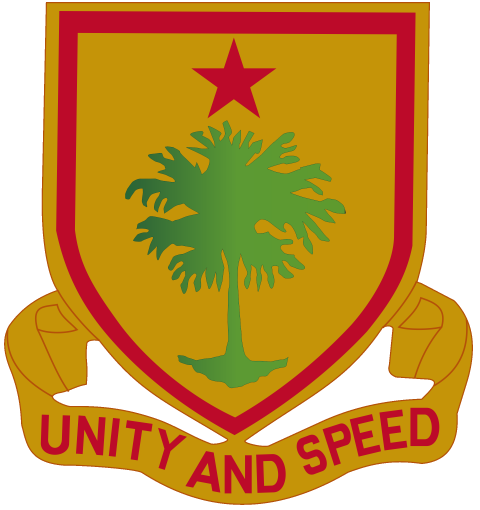
- Distinctive Unit Insignia

The 314th Cavalry Regiment was a cavalry unit of the United States Army during World War I and the interwar period. It was activated in early 1918 but broken up later that year to form new artillery units. The unit was recreated as a Kentucky Organized Reserve unit during the interwar period and was later transferred to Ohio. It was converted into a signal aircraft warning regiment after the United States entered World War II.

== History ==
Shortly after the United States entered World War I, the regiment was constituted in the National Army on 18 May 1917 and organized on 6 April 1918 at Camp Owen Bierne, El Paso, Texas, commanded by Colonel Cornelius C. Smith. It was broken up on 16 October 1918 into the 62nd and 63rd Field Artillery Regiments and the 21st Trench Mortar Battery. All three artillery units were demobilized at Camp Jackson: the 21st Trench Mortar Battery on 2 January 1919, the 63rd Field Artillery on 17 January, and the 62nd Field Artillery on 19 January.

On 15 October 1921, the 62nd and 63rd Field Artillery and the 21st Trench Mortar Battery were reconstituted in the Organized Reserve as the 314th Cavalry Regiment, part of the 64th Cavalry Division in the Fifth Corps Area. The 314th was initiated (activated) in January 1922 with regimental headquarters and 2nd Squadron at Lexington, Kentucky, and 1st Squadron at Middletown, Kentucky. The regiment joined the division's 157th Cavalry Brigade. On 15 April 1925, the regimental headquarters was relocated to Cynthiana, Kentucky, the 1st Squadron to Lexington, and the 2nd Squadron to Richmond, Kentucky. It was reorganized as a three-squadron regiment on 1 July 1929. The entire 314th was moved to Lexington on 9 July 1931, to Columbus, Ohio on 5 April 1937, and to Dayton, Ohio, on 22 May 1939.

The regiment conducted summer training at Camp Knox and Fort Oglethorpe with the 6th Cavalry Regiment. The 314th's primary ROTC feeder school was the Culver Military Academy. After the United States entered World War II, the regiment was converted into the 545th Signal Aircraft Warning Regiment on 30 January 1942. The regiment was disbanded on 11 November 1944. An unrelated Organized Reserve unit, the 314th Armored Cavalry Regiment, briefly existed postwar in Tennessee.

== Commanders ==
The 314th was commanded by the following officers:

- Colonel Cornelius C. Smith (6 April–15 October 1918)
- Lieutenant Colonel Otto Miller (January–20 April 1922)
- Major John H. Terry (20 April–16 October 1922)
- Colonel George T. Smith (16 October 1922 – 15 April 1925)
- Colonel O.H. McGee (15 April 1925 – August 1927)
- Major Lewis A. Maury (May 1933 – June 1934)
- Colonel Paul H.M. Converse (June 1935 – January 1941)

== Heraldry ==
The 314th's coat of arms was approved on 21 September 1925 and its distinctive unit insignia was approved on 30 October of that year. The distinctive unit insignia included a 1 1/8 in (2.86 cm) gold colored metal and enamel device, which consisted of a golden shield with a red star above a palmetto tree in the center and a red border. The shield's color represented cavalry, the red border its artillery service, the star its organization in Texas, and the palmetto its training at Camp Jackson in South Carolina. The regimental motto, "Unity and Speed", was attached to the bottom of the distinctive unit insignia. The regimental coat of arms was of a similar design to the distinctive unit insignia but included the Organized Reserve's Minuteman crest above the shield and omitted the motto.
