= 308th Cavalry Regiment =

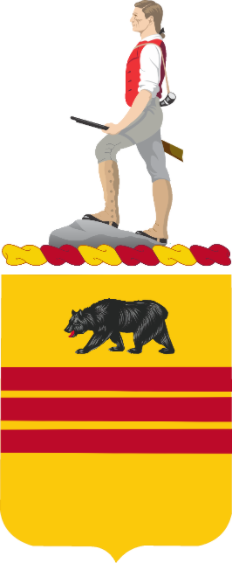
- 308th Cavalry Regiment Coat of Arms
- Active: 1917–1918; 1921–1942
- Country: United States
- Branch: United States Army
- Type: Cavalry
- Size: Regiment
- Part of: Army Reserve
- Motto: Latin: Nunquam non paratus
- Facings: Yellow
- Engagements: World War I

Insignia
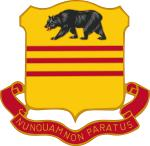
- Regimental Insignia

The 308th Cavalry Regiment, commonly referred to as the 308th Cavalry, was a reserve regiment of the United States Army from 1917 until 1942. In September 1918, it was converted into the 65th and 66th Field Artillery, and the 22d Trench Mortar Battery. The units were stationed at Camp Kearny, California. Although demobilized in December 1918, they were re-formed and re-purposed in October 1921 as the 308th Cavalry, an element of the 62d Cavalry Division. During World War II, it was disbanded again. In 1959, the regimental headquarters was transferred to Department of the Army control.

== World War I ==
The 308th Cavalry was constituted on 18 May 1917, in the National Army and organized on 24 February 1918, at Camp Harry J. Jones, Arizona. The regiment was broken up on 13 September and its men were used to create the 65th and 66th Field Artillery, and the 22d Trench Mortar Battery. The two field artillery regiments were demobilized at Camp Kearny, California, on 22 December preceded by the trench mortar battery on the previous day.

== Inter-war years ==
The 65th and 66th Field Artillery, and the 22d Trench Mortar Battery were reconstituted on 15 October 1921, in the Organized Reserves (present-day Army Reserve) as the 308th Cavalry, an element of the 62d Cavalry Division. The regiment was re-formed for the second time on 10 November 1921, with its headquarters at Cumberland, Maryland, but transferred to western Pennsylvania around October 1922, relocating its headquarters to Pittsburgh in 1923. In 1928, members of the regiment built the 308th Cavalry Club in Aspinwall on land owned by the local hospital, with equestrian, pistol, and saber training areas, as a site for inactive training. In July of that year, the regiment conducted its annual summer training with the 52d Cavalry Brigade at Mount Gretna. On 1 July 1929, the 308th Cavalry was reorganized to consist of three squadrons. Simultaneously, all of its units were moved to Pittsburgh.

The regiment usually held its Inactive Training Period meetings at the 107th Field Artillery's Hunt Armory or at the city's Post Office Building, and used the horses of the 107th for regular equestrian training. It conducted summer training at Fort Myer and Fort Belvoir with the 3d Cavalry. As an alternate form of training, the 308th Cavalry provided basic military instruction to civilians under the Citizens' Military Training Camp program at Fort Myer. Its designated mobilization training station was the York Concentration Area in Pennsylvania, and its primary ROTC feeder school was the Valley Forge Military Academy. Between 4 and 25 August 1940, the 308th Cavalry Regiment participated in the First Army maneuvers in western New York, which involved 81,000 men.

== Later history ==
After the Pearl Harbor resulted in the American entry into World War II, it was converted into the 66th Tank Destroyer Battalion on 30 January 1942. The 66th was disbanded on 11 November 1944.

== Commanders ==
The following served in the position of Commander:

- 1918 Colonel John J. Boniface
- 1918 Colonel Hugh D. Berkeley
- 1921–1922 Lieutenant Colonel Elmer J. Kingsbury
- 1922–1926 Colonel Josiah L. Reese
- 1926 Colonel Jean H. A. Day
- 1927–1930 Colonel Josiah L. Reese
- 1930–1941 Colonel George H. Cherrington
- 1941 Lieutenant Colonel John H. Schenkel

== Heraldry ==
The 308th Cavalry's coat of arms was approved on 9 July 1925, and its distinctive unit insignia was approved on 13 March 1926. Both were rescinded on 17 February 1959. The distinctive unit insignia included a 1 1/8 in (2.86 cm) gold colored metal and enamel device, which consisted of a shield with three red bars in the center below a bear, and a red and gold scroll below the shield, which was inscribed with the regimental motto, "Nunquam non paratus". The shield symbolized the United States Cavalry, the bear, similar to that on the Seal of California, represented the unit's California service in World War I, and the red bars symbolized three World War I field artillery units that were included in the regiment's lineage. The motto was Latin for "Never unprepared". The regiment's coat of arms was similar to the distinctive unit insignia except that it added the Organized Reserve crest, a Minuteman, and omitted the motto.

== See also ==
- List of U.S. armored and cavalry regiments
