= Third Corps Area =

- Active: 20 August 1920– 7 December 1941
- Country: United States of America
- Branch: United States Army
- Type: Military District
- Role: Training
- Part of: Department of War
- Garrison/HQ: Fort Howard, Maryland

Third Corps Area was a Corps Area of the United States Army, active from 20 August 1920–7 December 1941. It was established with its headquarters at Fort Howard, Maryland and organized from elements of the deactivated Eastern Department. The headquarters moved to Baltimore on 12 May 1922. It covered the states of Pennsylvania, Maryland, Virginia, and the District of Columbia. At is height, the Third Corps Area had 60,548 soldiers in 1943.

The District of Columbia would become its own separate command, the Military District of Washington in September 1921. In 1927, the District of Washington would again be a part of the Third Corps Area.

Third Corps Area was responsible for the mobilization, administration, and training of units of the III Corps (8th Division, 28th Division, and 29th Division) and XIII Corps (79th Division, 80th Division, 99th Division), coast defense units of the Third Coast Artillery District, 2nd Bombardment Wing and select units of the GHQR. The Third Corps Area Training Center was established in 1921, originally at Camp George G. Meade, Maryland, to train regular army and organized reserve units, as well as ROTC cadets and CMTC candidates.

Third Corps Area was responsible for the ROTC program at: Georgetown University, Howard University, St. John's College, Johns Hopkins University, University of Maryland, Mount St. Mary's College, Carnegie Institute of Technology, Drexel Institute, Lafayette College, Lehigh University, Pennsylvania Military College, University of Pennsylvania, University of Pittsburgh, Pennsylvania College, Pennsylvania State College, Hampton Institute, Virginia Agricultural and Mechanical College and Polytechnic Institute, and Virginia Military Institute.

During this period there were complaints that there were not enough CMTC camps, and especially camps for "negro" youths. But in the Third Corps Area the camps in the 1930s were staffed by African American officers and had 24,000 African America troops available to create two regiments or about 12 percent of their entire strength. "CMTC training was very popular among Black youths in the Third and Ninth Corps areas," according to historian Robert F. Jefferson.

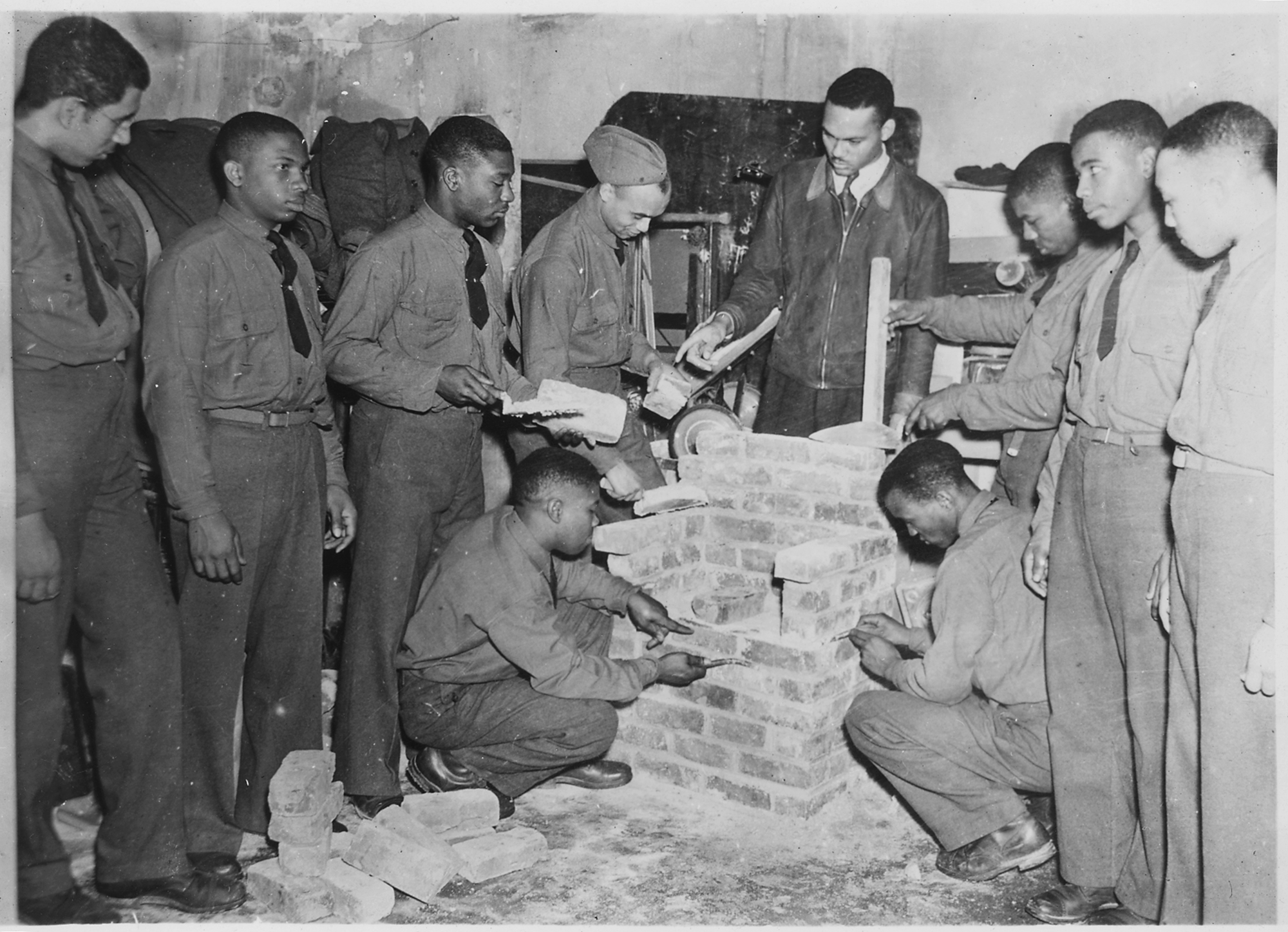
Civilian Conservation Corps, Third Corps Area: Richmond, Virginia, Co. 1372 and Co. 1375 - brick masonry class at Armstrong Night School

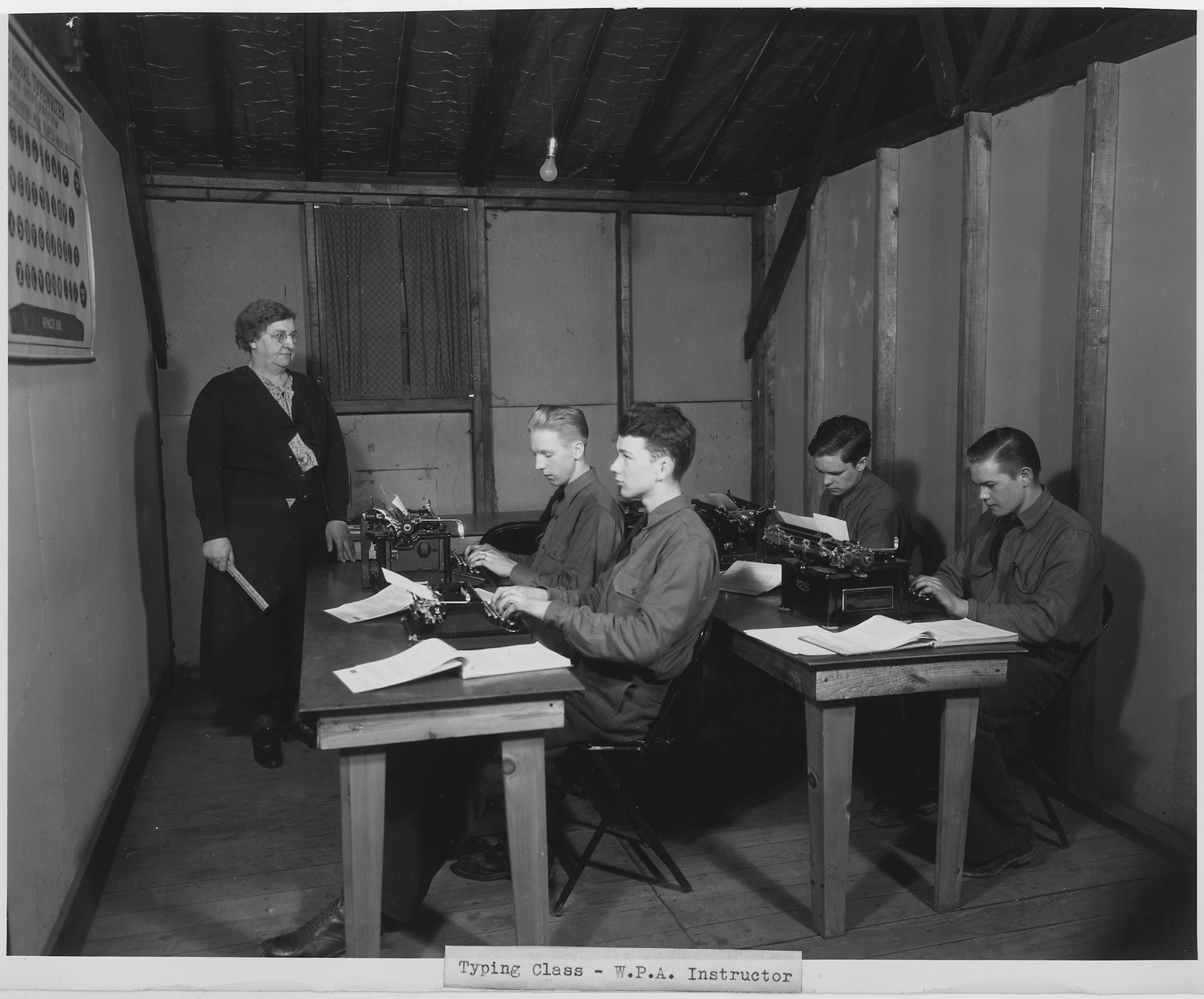
Civilian Conservation Corps, Third Corps Area: typing class with W.P.A. instructor

In April 1933, the Civilian Conservation Corps selected army posts and depots to use for the initial training of CCC enrollees. In the Third Corps area they were Carlisle Barracks, Fort Hoyle, Fort Howard, Holabird Quartermaster Depot, Fort George G. Mead, Fort Washington, Fort Humphreys, Fort Monroe, Fort Storey and Langley Field. The Third Corps Area was also expected to contribute military doctors to the CCC for the health of the new volunteers. African American CCC camps were often set apart from white camps and in southern states were always segregated.

Starting in 1933, Third Corps Area headquarters began to integrate the CCC radio network with the Army Amateur Radio Service (AARS) with allowed for CCC enrollees to contact their families at home for free.

The Corps Area headquarters also helped CCC enrollees find work, especially in Baltimore, which was near its headquarters. The Corps Area also responded to natural disasters in Pennsylvania (Pittsburgh flood of 1936) and Maryland (1933 Chesapeake–Potomac hurricane) and used the CCC men as labor.

In May 1934, Clarence J. Grinnell was assigned as Educational Advisor at Camp S-62. Grinnell had been placed at Camp 317 in Hills Grove, Pa. but he was sent away from Camp 317 due to it being a white camp as African Americans were prohibited from overseeing white enrollees.

With the adoption of the four field army plan on 1 October 1933, the mobile units of the Third Corps Area were reassigned to the First Army or GHQ Reserve, or were demobilized. The Inspector General's office was also suggesting eliminating officer positions and consolidating functions throughout the 1930s as cost saving measures. The inspectors general also found that the National Guard units in the Third Corps disregarded regulations and had poor accountability.

The Third Corps Area was redesignated as the Third Corps Area Service Command (CASC) in May 1941 and redesginated again as Third Service Command 22 July 1942.

In the post-war reorganization the Second Army was formed from Headquarters Third Service Command. Headquartered at Baltimore, Maryland, it included PA, MD, VA, WV, OH, IN and KY.

== Commanders ==
Third Corps Area

- Major General Adelbert Cronkhite 1 September 1920–26 July 1921
- Brigadier General Charles J. Bailey 26 July 1921–17 August 1921
- Major General Harry F. Hodges 17 August 1921–10 November 1921
- Major General Charles J. Bailey 10 November 1921–1 December 1922
- Major General Charles H. Muir 3 December 1922–18 July 1924
- Major General William R. Smith 19 July 1924–1 November 1924
- Major General Samuel D. Sturgis Jr. 2 November 1924–26 June 1925
- Brigadier General Robert E. Callan 26 June 1925–1 August 1925
- Major General Douglas MacArthur 1 August 1925–3 September 1928
- Major General Fred W. Sladen 14 September 1928–3 August 1931
- Major General Paul B. Malone 3 August 1931–18 February 1935
- Major General Robert E. Callan 18 February 1935–30 September 1935
- Major General Albert J. Bowley 2 October 1935–1 February 1938
- Brigadier General John W. Gulick 16 February 1938–1 April 1938
- Major General James K. Parsons 1 April 1938–3 October 1940

Third Corps Area Service Command

- Major General Walter S. Grant 11 October 1940–21 August 1941
- Major General H. Conger Pratt 21 August 1941–4 January 1942

Third Service Command

- Major General Milton C. Reckord (5 January 1942– 30 November 1943)
- Major General Philip Hayes 1 December 1943–3 January 1946)
- Major General Manton S. Eddy 3 January 1946–November 1946
