= Citizens' Military Training Camp =

Summer military training programs of the United States, 1921–1940

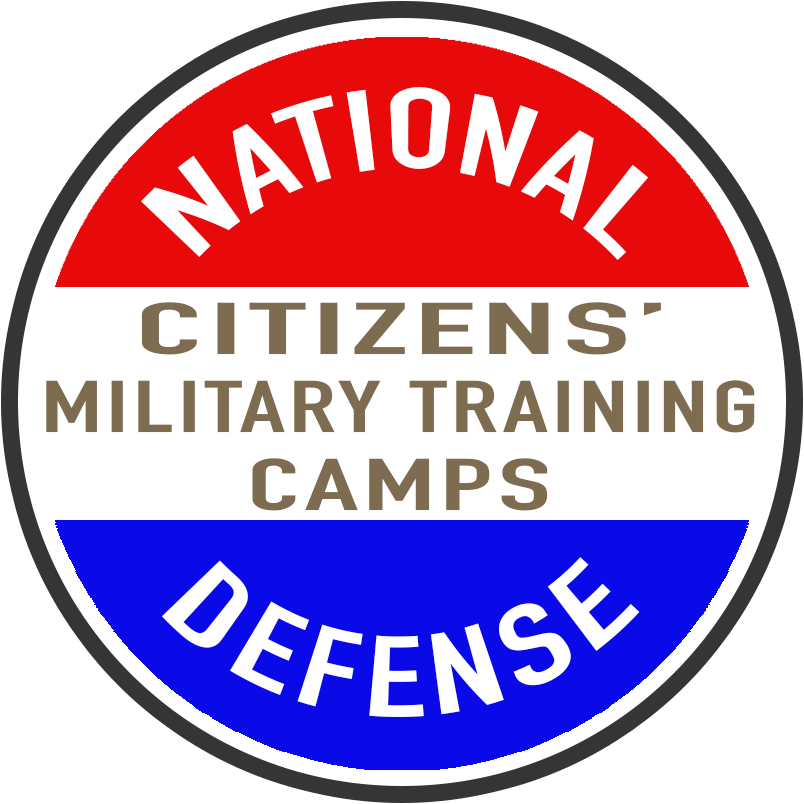
Citizens' Military Training Camps Logo

Citizens' Military Training Camps (CMTC) were United States government authorized military training programs held annually each summer during the years 1921 to 1940. CMTC camps differed from National Guard and Organized Reserve training in that the program allowed young male citizens age 17-24 to obtain basic military training without incurring an obligation to be called up for active duty. The CMTC were authorized by the National Defense Act of 1920 as part of a compromise that rejected universal military training. The young men received transportation, food, quarters, uniforms and equipment completely free. In its nearly two decades of operation, the CMTC trained some 400,000 men in at least one season from 1921 to 1940. Overall the program was disappointing, as only 5,000 officer commissions were awarded to men who completed the required four summers of training.

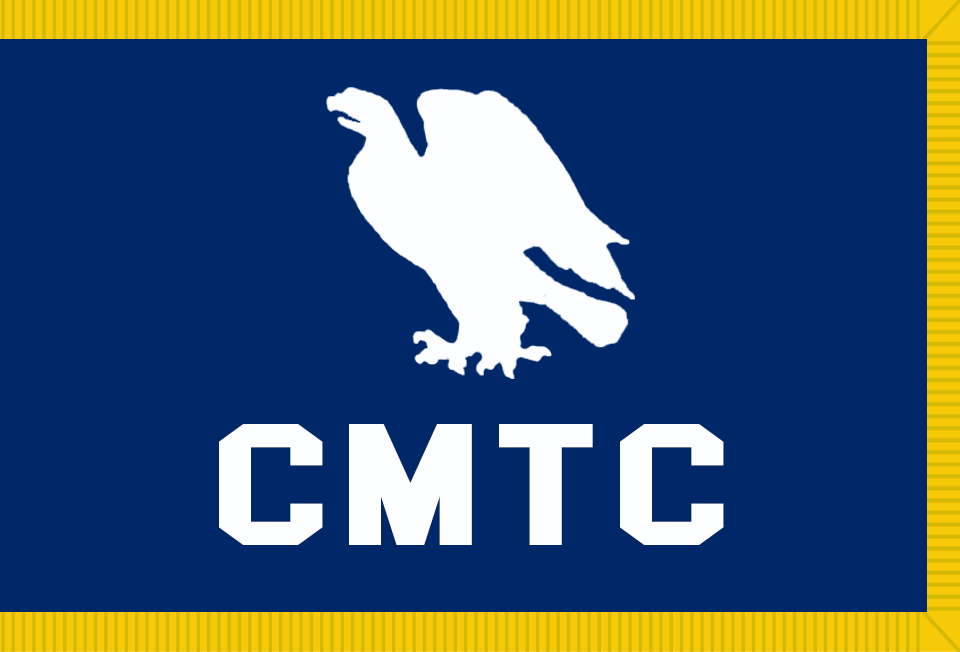
Citizens' Military Training Camps Flag

Before the United States entered World War I, private citizens of the Preparedness Movement set up what were known as the "Plattsburg camps" to build a reserve of qualified men. These provided at least one summer of training in 1915 and 1916 to some 40,000 men, who were all college graduates and largely drawn from elite social classes.

== Plattsburgh camps ==
As tensions increased and war broke out in Europe in 1914, some Americans concerned about United States participation organized the Preparedness Movement, made up of a group of influential Americans who supported the Allies of World War I. Before the U.S. entered into World War I, private citizens organized what were known as the "Plattsburgh camps,” a volunteer pre-enlistment training program. The group recognized that the standing U.S. Army was far too small to help the Allies and would have to expand immensely if the U.S. went to war. The Movement established the camps to train additional potential Army officers during the summers of 1915 and 1916.

The largest and best known camp was near Plattsburgh, New York under the command of Captain Halstead Dorey. Trainees included Grenville Clark, Willard Straight, Robert Bacon, Mayor John Purroy Mitchel, and Bishop James De Wolf Perry.

Some 40,000 men (all college graduates) attended the Plattsburgh camp and other sites. They spent 90-days to become physically fit, learned to march and shoot, and provided the cadre of a wartime officer corps. Enlistees were required to pay their own expenses. Suggestions by labor unions that talented working-class youth be invited to Plattsburgh were ignored.

These camps were formalized under the Military Training Camps Association, which in 1917 launched a monthly magazine, National Service. (In 1922, the magazine was acquired by and folded into The American Army and Navy Journal, and Gazette of the Regular, National Guard and Reserve Forces.)

== CMTC ==
The program was divided into four, four-week courses designated “Basic,” “Red,” “White.” and “Blue.” The Basic Course consisted of preparation for military life, such as physical training, first aid, and camp cleanliness. The Red Course consisted of preliminary and practical military training (school of the soldier) and an introduction to a branch of service. Completion of this course made a candidate eligible to enlist in the Enlisted Reserve Corps and for attendance at the White Course. The White Course consisted of intermediate military training, including small unit tactics, marksmanship, basic aspects of the arm or service of the camp. Completion of this course made a candidate eligible for promotion to non-commissioned officer rank in the Enlisted Reserve Corps and for attendance at the Blue Course. Red and White Courses also allowed students to learn more specialized areas such as artillery, infantry, engineering or the signal corps. The Blue Course consisted of more advanced military training, including aspects of leadership, officership, and advanced aspects of the arm or service of the camp. Completion of this course made a candidate eligible for commissioning as a second lieutenant in the arm or service in which he was qualified at the four camps. Ideally, a CMTC candidate attended one of these courses each summer over a four-year period. Upon conclusion of the fourth course, and after the candidate had taken the required pre-commissioning examinations, he would be offered a commission as a second lieutenant in the Organized Reserve.

CMTC Collar Insignia
Basic Course	Red Course	White Course	Blue Course

At their peak in 1928 and 1929, about 40,000 men received training annually in 51 camps nationwide, but the camps were considered disappointing in achieving stated goals, especially in the commissioning of Organized Reserve officers; only 5,000 such commissions were awarded over the 20-year history of the CMTC. No records appear to have survived that document total participation, but it is estimated that 400,000 men had at least one summer of training. Among known participants were Harry S. Truman, Ronald Reagan, Robert Penn Warren, Walter S. McIlhenny, Chuck Yeager, John J. McCloy and William Guarnere.

In December 1928, Secretary of War Dwight F. Davis directed that Organized Reserve units (rather than individual Reserve personnel) be used in the actual running of CMTC camps and the conduct of training for CMTC cadets. These camps gave Organized Reserve and "Regular Army Inactive" (RAI) units that were staffed with Reserve personnel one of their few chances to operate like fully functional organizations. Unlike Regular Army or National Guard units, Organized Reserve and RAI units possessed few enlisted men and were essentially officer cadres. Therefore, the Citizens’ Military Training Camps provided superb opportunities for these units' officers to conduct the training of organizations and exercise effective command from the squad to regimental level. These camps also gave the units' staffs a chance to wrestle with realistic personnel, training and planning challenges as well. In this way, the CMTC also substantially contributed to preparing tens of thousands of Organized Reserve officers for the leadership demands of military command and staffs. Additionally, the military training provided by the Reservists and their Regular Army counterparts, introduced hundreds of thousands of young men to military discipline, order, and training. Many of these men would later serve in World War II as volunteers, draftees, and, for a substantial number, as officers. In at least these two ways, the CMTC was partially responsible for the U.S. Army's ability to rapidly mobilize for, and fight in, World War II.

Camp Perry, Ohio sponsored a national rifle match where teams from other camps would compete for prizes.

Camp Edwin F. Glenn, a CMTC camp located on Fort Benjamin Harrison, near Indianapolis, Indiana, was listed on the National Register of Historic Places in 1995.

== Universal Military Training Program ==
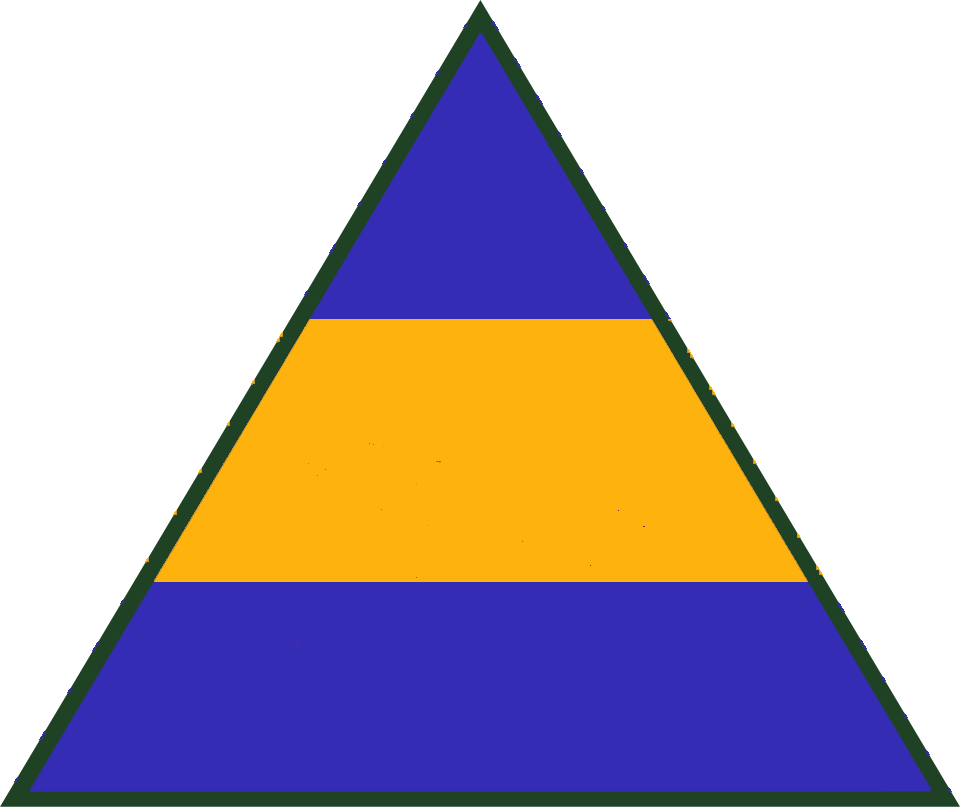
US Army Universal Military Training Experimental Unit SSI 1947-1948

After World War II, President Harry S. Truman in an October 1945 speech to a Joint Session of Congress, proposed one year of military training for every male American when they turned 18 years old. This was somewhat similar to the CMTC programs before World War II.

The Army tried out the Universal Military Training Experimental Unit at Fort Knox in 1947. The program was an extended basic training followed by six months of training about the different branches of the Army and then six months of technical service school. The program would have been extended to all 18-20 year old American males to take the mandatory training to improve military readiness as the conflict with the Soviet Union began to replace the Axis powers as the main threat to the United States. The program ended in 1948 after Congress failed to approve it.

== See also ==
- Presidency of Woodrow Wilson
- American entry into World War I
- Preparedness Movement

== Bibliography ==
- Kington, Donald M. (1995). Forgotten summers : the story of the Citizens' Military Training Camps, 1921-1940. San Francisco, CA: Two Decades Pub. ISBN 0964578905. OCLC 33986603.
- The Plattsburger. [Wynkoop, Hallenbeck, Crawford Co.] 1917. OCLC 5527390.
- The Red, White and Blue Manuals: ... a Text Book for the Citizens' Military Training Camp. Johns Hopkins Press. 1921. OCLC 4785515. Other editions are available.
