= Utah State Route 315 =

State highway in Utah, United States

State Route 315
- 750 North
- SR 315 highlighted in red

Route information
- Maintained by UDOT
- Length: 1.760 mi (2.832 km)
- Existed: 1974–present

Major junctions
- West end: Willard Bay State Park
- I-15 / I-84 in Willard
- East end: US 89 in Willard

Location
- Country: United States
- State: Utah
- Counties: Box Elder

Highway system
- Utah State Highway System; Interstate; US; State; Minor; Scenic
← SR-314	→ SR-316

State Route 315 (SR-315) is a short state highway in Box Elder County, Utah. It serves to connect U.S. Highway 89 and Interstate 15/Interstate 84 to Willard Bay State Park.

== Route description ==
SR-315 begins at the entrance to the parking lot at the north marina of Willard Bay State Park, within the boundaries of the state park. It proceeds north through the park, passing entrances to Eagle Beach and Cottonwood Campground. After approximately 0.7 miles (1.1 km), the route passes the fee station and exits the park boundary, before making a turn to the northeast onto 750 North. The route then comes to a diamond interchange at I-15/I-84, exit 357 on that highway. It then crosses the Union Pacific Railroad before veering slightly east. It continues another 0.75 miles (1.21 km) east through the town of Willard before coming to its east end at US-89.

== History ==
When I-15 was built through the Willard area, several surface roads were constructed as well, including 750 North; the Utah Department of Transportation Region One director recommended 750 North be added to the state highway system. Discussions within UDOT concluded the route should be extended to the state park and designated as a park access road, therefore receiving a number higher than 280. On December 20, 1974, the Utah Transportation Commission approved a resolution to add 750 North and the road to the marina to the state system as SR-315.

== Major intersections ==
The entire route is in Willard, Box Elder County.

mi	km	Destinations	Notes
0.000	0.000	Willard Bay State Park marina parking lot	Western terminus
0.706	1.136	State park fee station	
0.840– 0.922	1.352– 1.484	I-15 / I-84 – Ogden, Tremonton	
1.760	2.832	US 89 – Willard, Perry, Brigham City	Eastern terminus
1.000 mi = 1.609 km; 1.000 km = 0.621 mi
