= William E. Cole =

U.S. Army Major General (1874–1953)

William Edward Cole
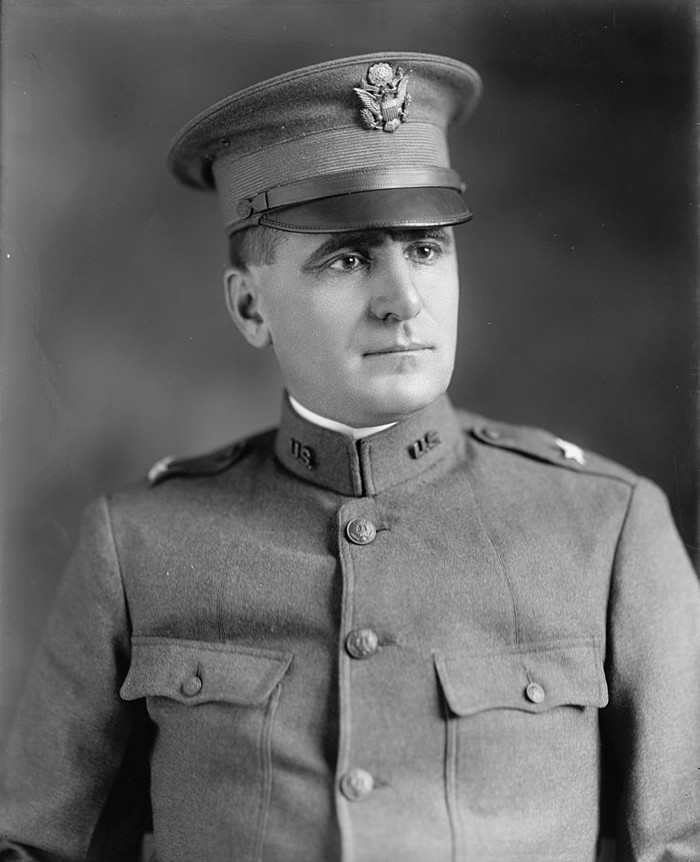
- William E. Cole, shown here as a brigadier general
- Born: September 22, 1874; Willard, Utah, US
- Died: May 18, 1953 (aged 79); Washington, D.C., US
- Military career
- Allegiance: United States of America
- Branch: United States Army
- Service years: 1898–1938; 1941–1944
- Rank: Major general
- Unit: Coast Artillery Corps
- Commands: Second Army; Fifth Corps Area; 5th Division
- Conflicts: World War I World War II
- Awards: Army Distinguished Service Medal

William Edward Cole (September 22, 1874 – May 18, 1953) was a decorated officer in the United States Army with the rank of major general. Having served during World War I, he distinguished himself as both a training officer and commander of the 11th Field Artillery Brigade and received the Army Distinguished Service Medal.

Originally a field artillery officer, he was later transferred to the Coast Artillery Corps and held numerous assignments in that branch. Cole reached the rank of major general and completed his career as commanding general, Second United States Army in 1938. Following the outbreak of World War II, he was recalled to active duty and served as a Member of the War Department Personnel Board until his second retirement in September 1944.

== Early career ==
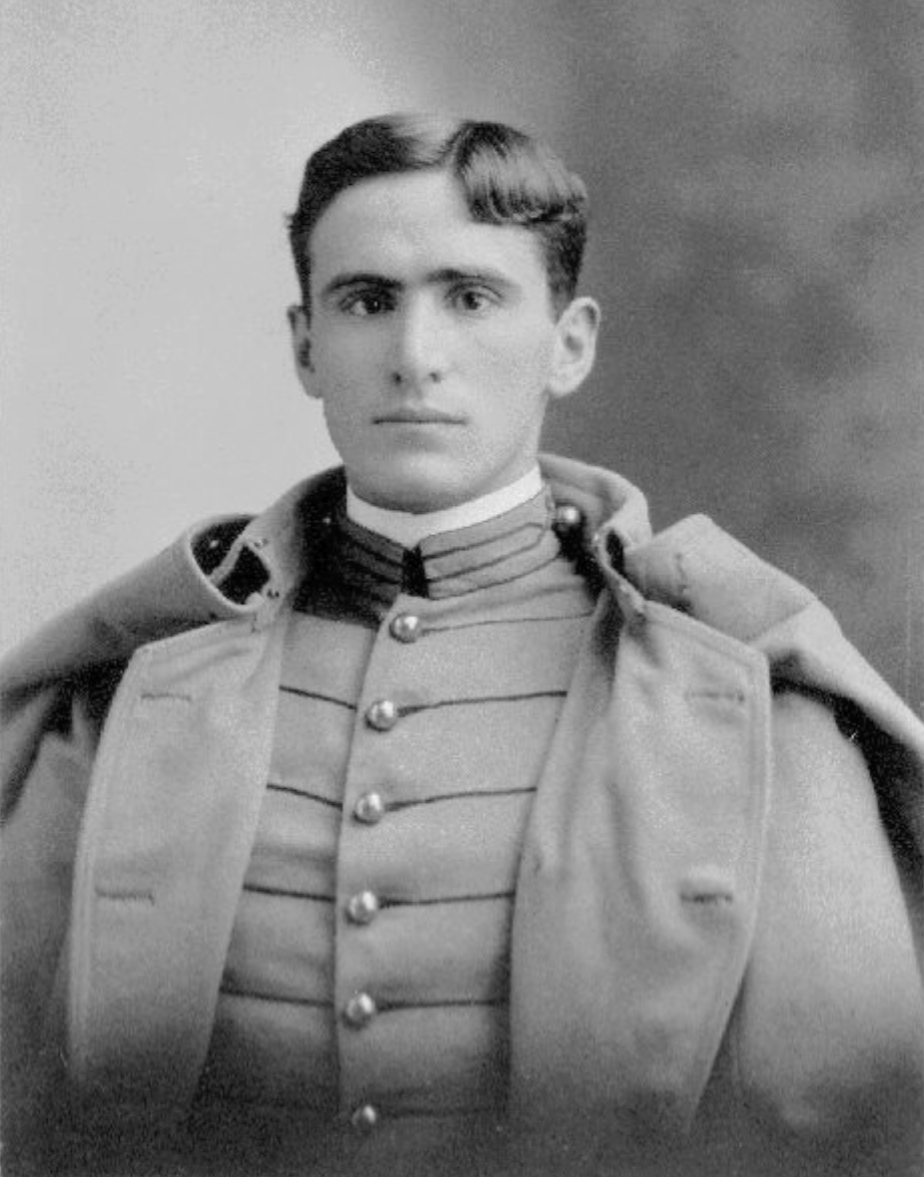
At West Point in 1898

William E. Cole was born on September 22, 1874, in Willard, Utah as the son of William E. Cole and Mary Jane Merrell. Following high school, he received an appointment to the United States Military Academy (USMA) at West Point, New York. He graduated with a bachelor's degree on July 5, 1898, and was commissioned second lieutenant in the Field Artillery branch.

Many of his classmates became general officers later: Conrad S. Babcock, Lytle Brown, Edwin D. Bricker, Henry W. Butner, Fox Conner, Malin Craig, Robert C. Davis, Berkeley Enochs, Amos Fries, James B. Gowen, Guy Henry, Manus MacCloskey, Thomas E. Merrill, George A. Nugent, Marcellus G. Spinks, John E. Stephens, David L. Stone or William P. Wooten.

Upon his graduation, Cole served at Fort Barrancas, Florida, and thus did not participate in Cuba or the Philippines during the Spanish–American War. He later served as quartermaster at Fort Totten, New York between 1908 and 1911 and in the Panama Canal Zone from 1914 to 1917 when a Coast Artillery District was being formed. Cole served as district material officer and was promoted to lieutenant colonel on June 22, 1917.

== World War I ==
By the end of September 1917, Cole returned to the United States and joined the Office of the Adjutant-General under Major General Henry P. McCain. However, he remained in this capacity just for one month and joined 351st Field Artillery Regiment as commanding officer and newly promoted temporary colonel. The 351st Field Artillery was one of the segregated artillery components of 92nd Infantry Division and consisted mostly of African Americans.

Cole spent several months with intensive training at Camp Meade, Maryland, and finally embarked with his regiment for France in June 1918. He landed in Brest on June 26, and proceeded for further training in Montmorillon, Vienne and Saulgé. Cole was promoted to the temporary rank of brigadier general on August 8, 1918, and ordered back to the United States.

He was appointed commanding general of the 11th Field Artillery Brigade and began with the intensive training program of the brigade for combat deployment in France. However, due to signing of the armistice in November 1918, the brigade did not go overseas. Cole was appointed commanding general of the 20th Field Artillery Brigade in mid-December and held that command until the beginning of January 1919, when he assumed command of Camp Jackson, South Carolina, where he supervised the demobilization of homecoming troops. For his service during World War I, he was decorated with the Army Distinguished Service Medal, the citation for which reads:

The President of the United States of America, authorized by Act of Congress, July 9, 1918, takes pleasure in presenting the Army Distinguished Service Medal to Brigadier General William Edward Cole, United States Army, for exceptionally meritorious and distinguished services to the Government of the United States, in a duty of great responsibility during World War I. As Commanding Officer of the 351st Field Artillery, 92d Division, from November 1917 to August 1918, by his rare judgment and exceptional ability, General Cole organized and trained his regiment to a high standard of efficiency under the most adverse circumstances. As Brigade Commander from August 1918 until December 1918, he again displayed resourcefulness and unusual ability in the successful organization and training of the 111th and 20th Field Artillery Brigades. As commanding General of Camp Jackson, South Carolina, from January 1919 to April 1919, he rendered most valuable and distinguished service in the demobilization of great numbers of troops and immense quantities of material.

== Interwar period ==
Cole was reverted to the peacetime rank of lieutenant colonel in April 1919 and ordered back to Washington, D.C., where he joined the Office of the Adjutant-General under Major General Peter C. Harris. He spent almost four months in that office and assumed command of 30th Coast Artillery Brigade with headquarters at Fort Eustis, Virginia. This railway brigade was tasked with the coastal defense in the area of Newport News, Virginia and Cole remained in that capacity until the end of May 1921. He also held additional temporary duty as commanding officer, Coast Artillery Training Center, Fort Monroe in September–November 1920.

He then assumed command of 43rd Coast Artillery Regiment in May 1921 and held that command for two months, before he was attached to the Office of the Chief of Coast Artillery Corps. Cole then served as Assistant to the Chief of Coast Artillery, Major General Frank W. Coe until the end of December 1924, when he was ordered to Hawaii for duty as chief of staff of the Hawaiian Coast Artillery Brigade under Brigadier General Richmond P. Davis.

Following the deactivation of the brigade in May 1925, Cole assumed duty as commanding officer of the 55th Coast Artillery Brigade and simultaneously served as commanding officer of the Coast Defenses of Pearl Harbor. He was promoted to the permanent rank of colonel on July 1, 1927, and left Hawaii shortly thereafter. Cole was then sent to the Fort Monroe, Virginia, and assumed duty as president of the Coast Artillery Board, which was responsible for the recommendations for innovations in the coast artillery corps. While in this capacity, Cole was given additional duty as commanding officer of the 30th Coast Artillery Brigade in January 1929.

Cole was promoted to the permanent rank of brigadier general on January 13, 1930, and ordered to the General Officers' Refresher Course at Fort Benning, Georgia, which he completed in March 1930. He then assumed command of 1st Coast Artillery District with headquarters in Boston, Massachusetts, and was responsible for the coastal defense of harbors and operationally significant maritime areas of the North Atlantic seaboard. This area included: Harbor Defenses of Boston, Long Island Sound, Narragansett Bay, New Bedford, Portland, and Portsmouth.

After a period of service with coast artillery units, Cole was appointed commanding general of the 22nd Infantry Brigade in October 1930 and served with that unit on Hawaii until January 1931, when he assumed duty as commanding officer of the Hawaiian Separate Coast Artillery Brigade. He was relieved by Brigadier General Robert S. Abernethy by the beginning of October 1932 and was appointed commanding officer of the 2nd Coast Artillery District in New York City.

He was responsible for the coastal defense of harbors and operationally significant maritime areas of New York, New Jersey, and Delaware and was promoted to major general on December 1, 1935. Cole assumed command of Fifth Corps Area at Fort Benjamin Harrison. While in this capacity, he also held additional duty as commanding general of the Second United States Army in December 1936 – September 1937.

== World War II and final years ==
Cole retired from active duty on September 30, 1938, but his retirement did not last long. He was recalled to active duty following the Japanese Attack on Pearl Harbor in December 1941 and was attached to the War Department Personnel Board, a body responsible for selecting individuals who were to receive direct commissions in the Army. He served as a member of this board under his West Point classmate and former chief of staff, General Malin Craig, until September 5, 1944, when he retired for a second time, completing almost 44 years of service.

Following his second retirement, Cole was active in the Church of Jesus Christ of Latter-day Saints and died following a long illness on May 18, 1953, at Walter Reed Army Medical Center. He was buried with full military honors at Arlington National Cemetery, Virginia. Together with his wife, Agnes Casey Cole (1878–1969), they had three sons: Colonel Hubert M. Cole, William E. Cole Jr. in diplomatic service in Africa and Francis K. Cole, lawyer in Columbus, Ohio.

== Quote ==
Following his death, his West Point classmate and lifelong friend, Major General Amos Fries, said about him:

General William E. Cole and I entered West Point together, on June 15, 1894. We were both from the far West, he from Utah, I from Oregon. Because our names were high on the alphabetical list of the class, we were, from the first, thrown much together.

We at once formed a close friendship which lasted as long as he lived. Not only were we close together in class standing, but, both being used to mountains and both loving the outdoors, we often climbed “Crows’ Nest”, a mountain rising about one thousand feet above West Point. We were two of the few who roamed the mountains.

Cole was a man of few words, always courteous and kindly. As well as I knew him I never heard him say a harsh word about any one. Yet he was a man of strong convictions, and clean, sterling character. I always respected him and loved him almost as a brother.

He made friends and kept them. He was not well for quite a long time but I never heard a word of complaint from him. Our Army service was never together, but I kept pretty good track of his service and counted him as one of the ablest and most successful of the class of fifty-nine members. His passing leaves a real void in the close friendships formed by four years of sustained effort at West Point.

I have treasured in my memory many happy hours spent in Cole’s company.

== Decorations ==
Here is Major General Cole's ribbon bar:

1st Row	Army Distinguished Service Medal		Spanish War Service Medal
2nd Row	World War I Victory Medal with two Battle Clasps	American Campaign Medal	World War II Victory Medal

== See also ==
- United States Army Coast Artillery Corps

== Bibliography ==
- Davis, Henry Blaine Jr. (1998). Generals in Khaki. Raleigh, North Carolina: Pentland Press. ISBN 1571970886. OCLC 40298151.

Military offices
Preceded by William K. Naylor	Commanding General Fifth Corps Area; January 25, 1936 – July 31, 1938	Succeeded by Daniel Van Voorhis
Preceded by Charles E. Kilbourne	Commanding General Second Army; December 18, 1936 – September 15, 1937	Succeeded by Hugh A. Drum
