= Fort Hayes Metropolitan Education Center =

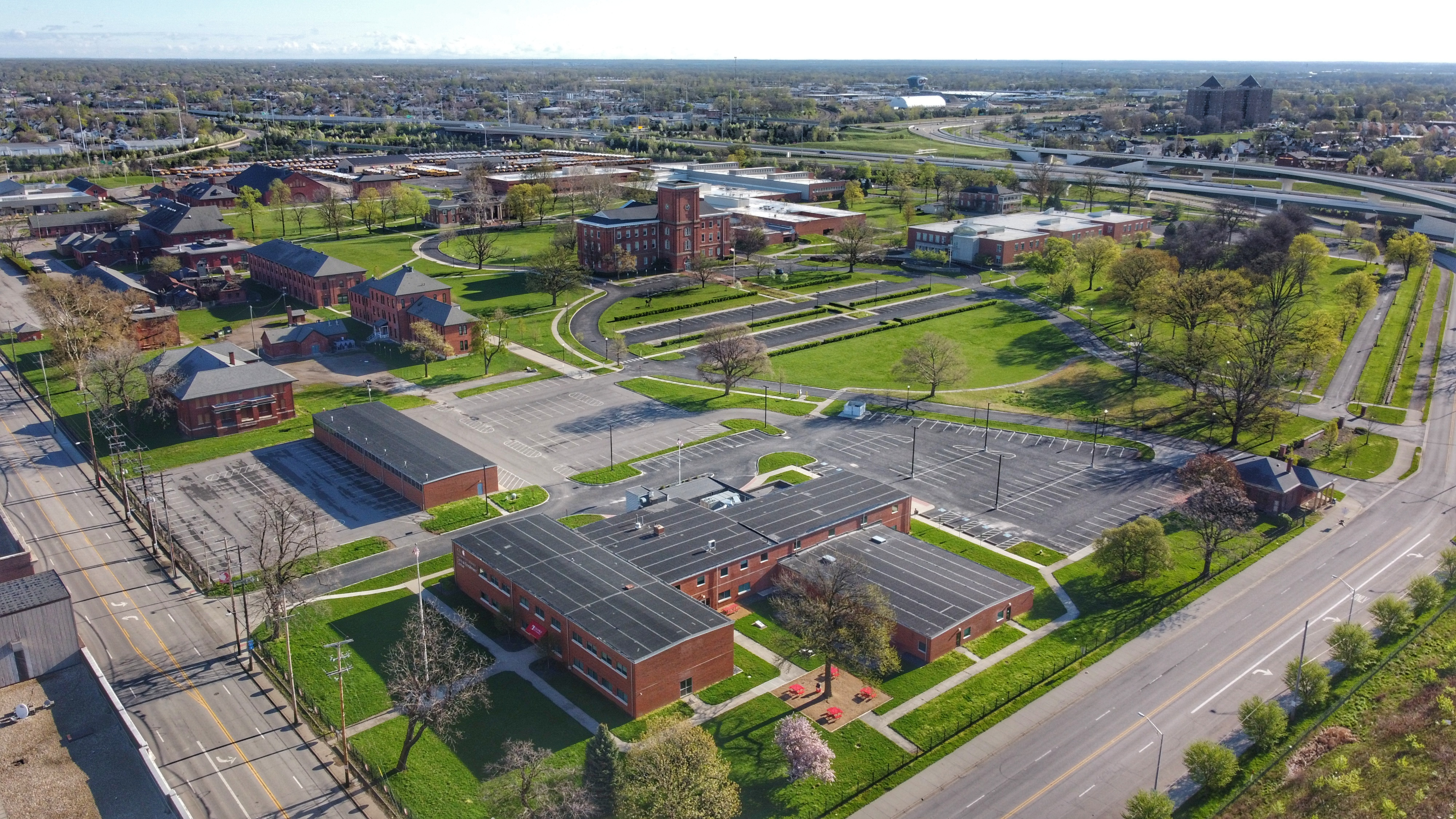

Location
- 546 Jack Gibbs Boulevard; Columbus, (Franklin County), Ohio 43215; United States
- Coordinates: 39°58′22″N 82°59′22″W

Information
- Type: Public high school
- Established: 1976
- School district: Columbus City Schools
- Grades: 9-12
- Colors: Red, white, black
- Accreditation: North Central Association of Colleges and Schools
- Website: https://forthayeshs.ccsoh.us/

Fort Hayes Metropolitan Education Center is a public magnet alternative school for students interested in an intensive academic and arts curriculum, located near Downtown Columbus, Ohio. This curriculum brings the study of arts and academics together through innovative activities. It is a school in the Columbus City Schools system. The campus opened in 1976 on the site of Fort Hayes, a former U.S. Army base.

== Organization ==
Fort Hayes Metropolitan Education Center has three divisions:

- Fort Hayes Arts and Academic High School
- Fort Hayes Career Center
- Arts IMPACT Middle School (AIMS)

== Admission ==
Each year students apply for 180 freshman openings and are selected by lottery. If a student goes to Arts IMPACT Middle School, which is on the same campus as Fort Hayes, they can choose to go to Fort Hayes without going through the lottery. Students who have been identified as gifted in the arts, can submit a portfolio and get granted selective admission before the standard lottery.

== Academics ==
All students are enrolled in college preparatory classes, and in courses relating to art history, art appreciation, performance, art creation, and art criticism. Students may choose AP classes in American history and government, African American studies, studio art, English, and music theory.

The school does not offer athletics. However, students can participate in athletic teams at their neighborhood school.

== Magnet school ==
Any student in a Columbus City Schools high school, or other high school in Franklin County, may apply to take classes in the Career Center. There are 18 intensive one-year, and two-year, programs in the areas of Business, Health, Performing Arts, and Visual Arts. The students in these programs have finished their first two, or three, years of high school. They come to the Fort Hayes Metropolitan Education Center for a half day each school day.

== Ranking ==
A 2007 study by U.S. News & World Report ranked the high school branch of Fort Hayes Metropolitan Education Center amongst the top high schools in the United States. The school was one of the 405 high schools to win a silver medal, ranking it below the 100 schools that won a gold medal and above the 1,086 schools that won a bronze medal. A total of 18,790 high schools were surveyed.
