= David L. Stone =

US Army general (1876–1959)

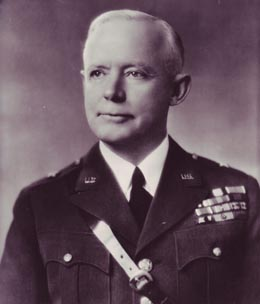
- Born: 15 August 1876; Stoneville, Mississippi
- Died: 28 December 1959 (aged 83) Tacoma, Washington
- Allegiance: United States
- Branch: United States Army
- Service years: 1898–1940
- Rank: Major General
- Commands: 5th Corps Area; Panama Canal Department; 3rd Infantry Division; 14th Infantry Brigade; 52nd Infantry Regiment; 14th Infantry Brigade (Acting); 3rd Infantry Regiment; 6th Infantry Regiment
- Conflicts: Spanish–American War; Philippine–American War; World War I
- Awards: Distinguished Service Medal; Silver Star; Purple Heart

David Lamme Stone Jr. (15 August 1876 – 28 December 1959) was a United States Army major general. As a junior officer in 1917, he supervised the creation of Camp Lewis in Washington state. As a general officer in 1936, he returned there to command the 3rd Infantry Division. He held several other commands until retiring in 1940.

== Early life and education ==
Stone was born in Stoneville, Mississippi. His parents both died when he was young, so he was raised by an aunt and uncle in nearby Greenville, Mississippi. Stone entered the United States Military Academy in June 1894. He graduated last in a class of 59 cadets in April 1898 and was commissioned as an infantry officer.

== Military career ==
Soon after graduation, Stone was sent to Cuba with the 22nd Infantry during the Spanish–American War. His regiment returned to Fort Crook in Nebraska and then was ordered to the Philippines in January 1899. He served in combat in the Philippines until the end of 1901. Stone returned to the United States in January 1902 and returned to the Philippines in November 1903. For his service during the Philippine–American War, he earned the Silver Star on his first tour and the Purple Heart on his second tour.

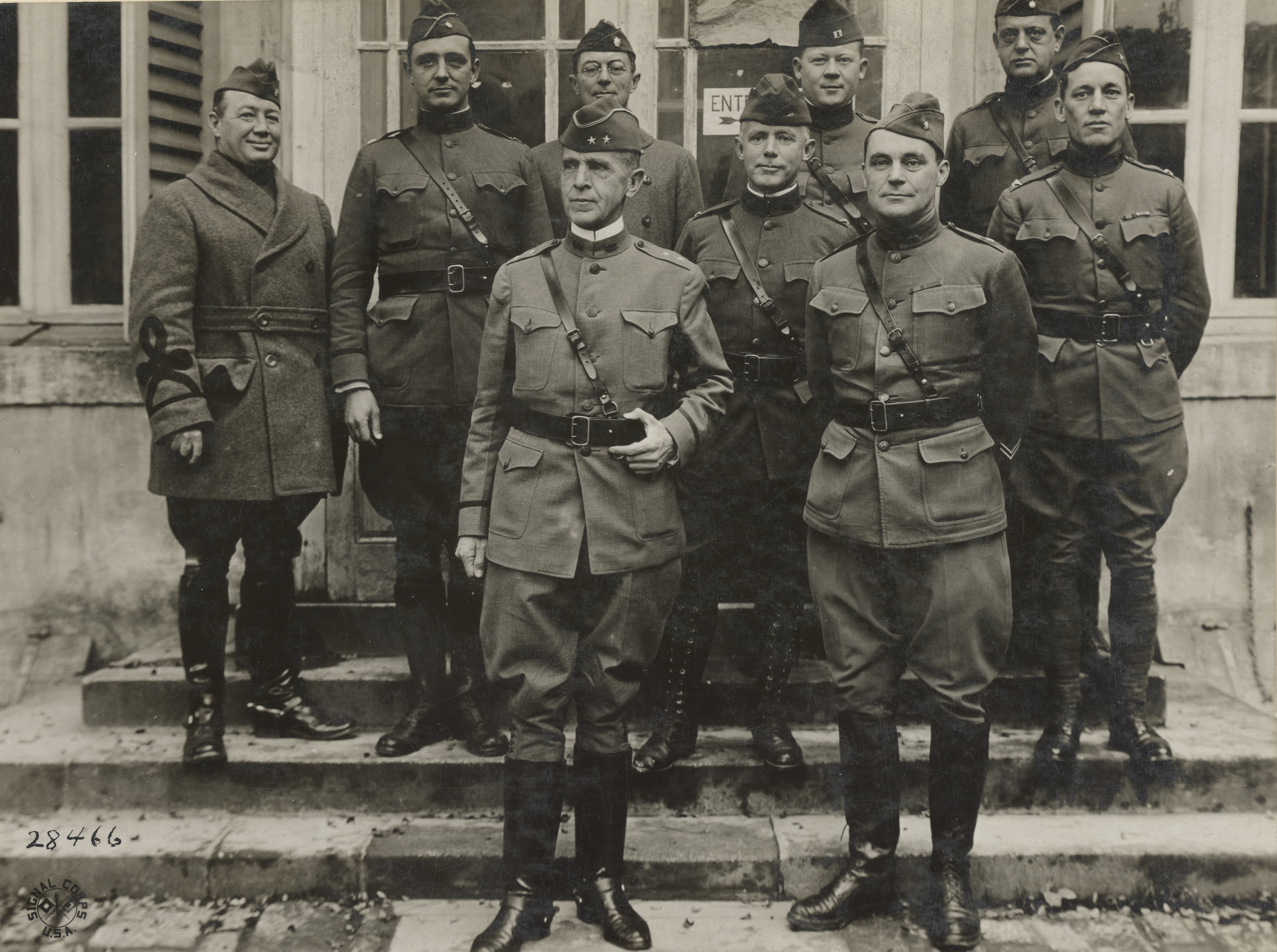
Major General Robert Lee Bullard, the newly appointed commander of the U.S. Second Army, pictured here with members of his staff at Second Army's headquarters at Toul, Meurthe-et-Moselle, France, October 20, 1918. Stood just behind Bullard is his deputy chief of staff, Colonel David L. Stone.

From June 1905 to August 1907, Stone received experience on construction work with the Quartermaster Department. From April 1909 to April 1912, he served as the constructing quartermaster at Fort Sill in Oklahoma. Stone was then assigned to the 25th Infantry, serving at Fort Lawton in Washington state and commanding a company in Hawaii until June 1915.

In May 1917, a month after the American entry into World War I, Stone was placed in charge of constructing Camp Lewis and promoted to major. He finalized the site selection and supervised the construction by Hurley Mason Contractors. On 5 August, Stone received a temporary promotion to lieutenant colonel. After successful completion of the construction project, he became division quartermaster for the 3rd Infantry Division in December 1917 at Camp Greene in North Carolina.

When the division was sent to France in May 1918, Stone became an assistant chief of staff and received a temporary promotion to colonel. In September, he was transferred to the Second Army headquarters staff, serving as deputy chief of staff from October 1918 to April 1919, when the headquarters was deactivated. Stone was awarded the Army Distinguished Service Medal for his World War I service, the citation for which reads:

The President of the United States of America, authorized by Act of Congress, July 9, 1918, takes pleasure in presenting the Army Distinguished Service Medal to Colonel (Quartermaster Corps) David Lamme Stone, United States Army, for exceptionally meritorious and distinguished services to the Government of the United States, in a duty of great responsibility during World War I. As Assistant Chief of Staff, G-1, 3d Division, as G-1 of that organization, and later as G-1, 2d Army, Colonel Stone performed with distinction his important duties. In the action from 5 July to 2 August 1918, near Chateau Thierry, and in the advance to the Ourcq River, he displayed tireless energy and ability of an unusually high order in supplying troops under the most difficult conditions. Aggressive and resourceful, he proved equal to every emergency.

After the war, he served as the American Army representative on the Inter-Allied Rhineland Commission until June 1920. Stone was actively involved in the post-war German reconstruction efforts.

Effective 1 July 1920, Stone was permanently promoted to colonel. From February 1923 to December 1924, he served on the General Staff of the 7th Corps Area in Omaha, Nebraska. From September 1924 to March 1926, Stone served as commander of the 6th Infantry Regiment. From March 1927 to June 1930, he was Executive for Reserve Affairs at the War Department. From July 1930 to July 1932, Stone commanded the 3rd Infantry Regiment and Fort Snelling in Minnesota. From May to November 1931, he was also acting commanding general of the 14th Infantry Brigade.

From August 1932 to June 1933, Stone taught military science and tactics at the University of Illinois Urbana-Champaign while also commanding the 52nd Infantry Regiment. On 24 May 1933, he was promoted to brigadier general. From July 1933 to September 1936, he commanded the 14th Infantry Brigade and Fort Snelling. Stone then commanded the 3rd Infantry Division at Fort Lewis from September 1936 to March 1937. On 1 October 1936, he was promoted to major general. From April 1937 to January 1940, Stone served as the commanding general of the Panama Canal Department. On 22 January 1940, he assumed command of the 5th Corps Area at Fort Hayes in Ohio. Stone relinquished command on 25 April 1940 and retired from active duty on 15 August 1940 upon reaching the mandatory retirement age of 64.

== Family and later life ==
Stone married Helen Lemon Hoagland (23 September 1876 – 16 March 1929) in 1903 while he was stationed at Fort Omaha in Nebraska. They had two daughters and two sons, but one of the boys died young. After his first wife's death, Stone remarried with divorcée Anita (Thorne) Corse (6 March 1895 – 5 June 1994) on 1 January 1936 at her family's mansion, Thornewood, on American Lake in Lakewood, Washington near Fort Lewis.

After retirement, Stone and his second wife lived at Thornewood, which she had inherited. When his health began to deteriorate, she sold the mansion and they moved to Tacoma, Washington. He died there at the age of 83 and was buried in the Camp Lewis Post Cemetery on 31 December 1959.

== Legacy ==
A circle at the center of the Camp Lewis Post Cemetery on Joint Base Lewis–McChord is dedicated to Major General David L. Stone and to all unknown American soldiers who died in active service. The David L. Stone Education Center at the base is also named in his honor.
