= Willard Historic District =

- U.S. National Register of Historic Places
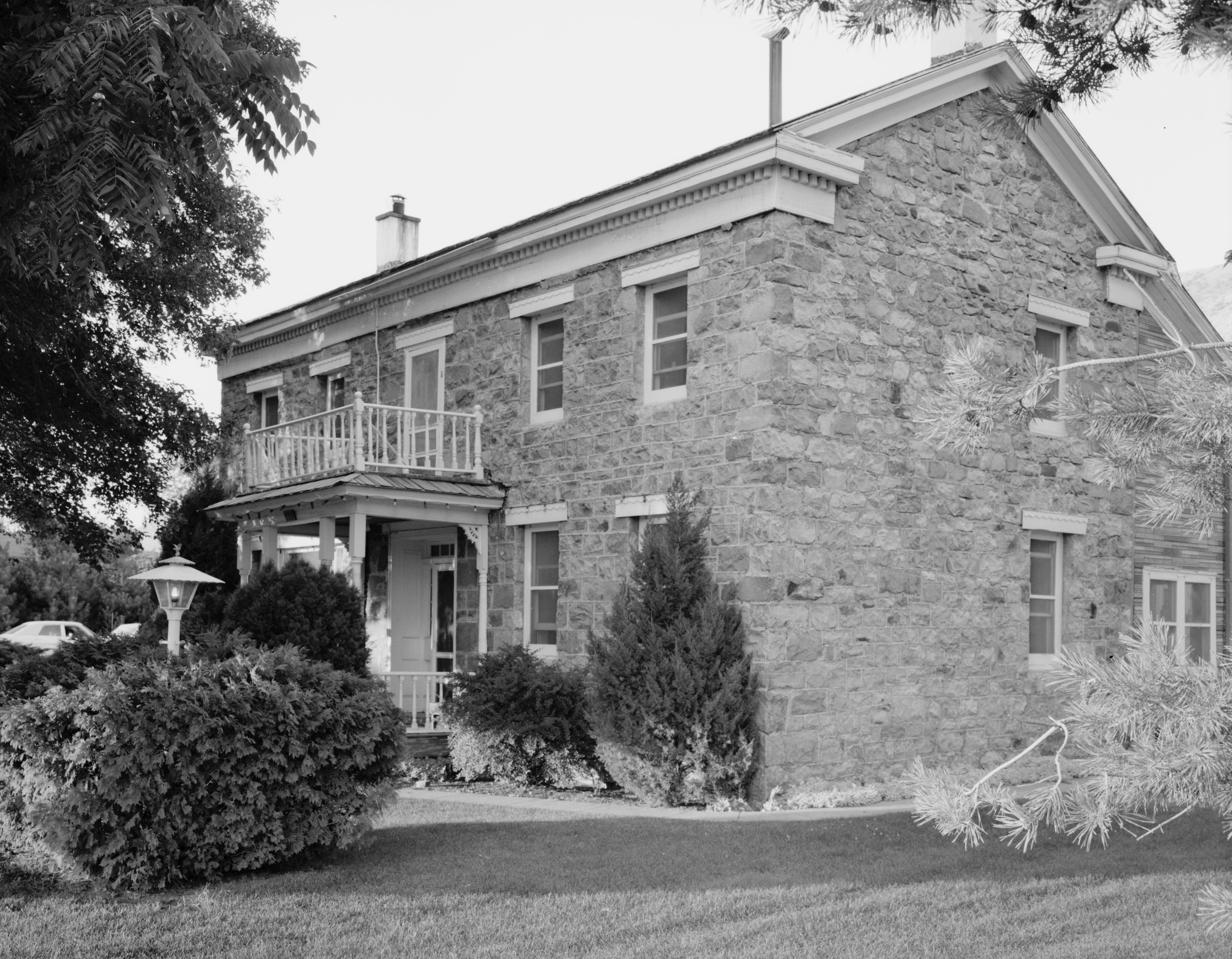
- HABS photo from 1985 of George Mason House

- Location within Utah Location within the United States Location within the United States
- Location: Roughly bounded by 200 West, 200 North, 100 East, and 200 South streets Willard, Utah; United States
- Coordinates: 41°24′33″N 112°02′09″W
- Area: 160 acres (0.65 km^{2})
- Built: 1851
- Built by: Jones, Shadrach
- Architectural style: Greek Revival, Gothic Revival
- NRHP reference No.: 74001933
- Added to NRHP: June 25, 1974

The Willard Historic District, is a historic district in Willard, Utah, United States, that is listed on the National Register of Historic Places (NRHP).

== Description ==
The district covers 160 acres (0.65 km^{2}), includes 117 contributing buildings, and is roughly bounded by 200 West, 200 North, 100 East, and 200 South streets.

It includes a school built in 1902, and work by builder Shadrach Jones, and some houses combining elements of Greek Revival and Gothic Revival style.

The town of Willard, about 45 miles (72 km) north of Salt Lake City, Utah was settled in 1851 and was originally named Willow Creek for the stream lined by willows which descended from a canyon and flows west toward the Great Salt Lake. It was later renamed Willard for Willard Richards, a Mormon apostle. One home in the district, the Lyman Wells House, was built in the early 1850s. The village was laid out largely in conformance to Mormon plans for a City of Zion.

The district was listed on the NRHP June 25, 1974.

== See also ==
- National Register of Historic Places listings in Box Elder County, Utah
