= Fifth Corps Area =

Military district of the US Army, 1920–1942

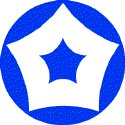
- Active: 20 August 1920–7 December 1941
- Country: United States of America
- Branch: United States Army
- Type: Military District
- Role: Training
- Part of: Department of War
- Garrison/HQ: Fort Benjamin Harrison, IN; Fort Hayes, OH

The Fifth Corps Area was a military district of the United States Army from 20 August 1920 to 7 December 1941. The Fifth Corps Area included the states of Indiana, Ohio, West Virginia, and Kentucky. Eventually it became Fifth Service Command on 22 July 1942, and then Fifth Service Command was disestablished in 1946.

Fifth Corps Area was established on 20 August 1920 with headquarters at Fort Benjamin Harrison, Indiana, and organized from parts of the discontinued Central Department. The headquarters was transferred to Fort Hayes, Columbus, Ohio, on 20 June 1922.

The headquarters was responsible for the units of the Second and Fifth Armies, the V Army Corps (5th, 37th, and 38th Divisions) and XV Army Corps (83rd, 84th, 100th Infantry Divisions), select General Headquarters (GHQ) Reserve units, and Zone of the Interior support units of the Fifth Corps Area Support Command.

The Fifth Corps Area Training Center was established in 1921, originally at Camp Knox, Kentucky (redesignated Fort Knox in 1932), to train regular army and organized reserve units, as well as ROTC cadets and CMTC candidates. With the inactivation of the Fifth Corps Area Training Center in October 1922, Camp Knox became the primary training center for corps area infantry, cavalry, and field artillery units.

In 1925 Air Service elements included the Air Service Officer, Fort Benjamin Harrison, Indiana; the Divisional Air Service, 5th Division with the 88th Observation Squadron at Wilbur Wright Field, Ohio (Major Hugh J. Knerr), and the associated 7th Photo Section.

Mobile units of the corps area, less GHQ Reserve and Z.I. units, were assigned to the Second and Fifth Armies from 1921 to 1933. With the adoption of the four field army plan on 1 October 1933, the units of the Fifth Corps Area were reassigned to the Second Army, GHQ Reserve, or demobilized.

Headquarters Company, V Corps was withdrawn from the Organized Reserve on 1 October 1933 and allotted to the Regular Army. At the same time, the Corps HQ was partially activated at Fort Hayes, OH, with Regular personnel from HQ, Fifth Corps Area, and Reserve personnel from the corps area at large. Though a Regular Army, Inactive, unit from 1927 to 1940, the Corps HQ was organized provisionally for short periods using its assigned Reserve officers and staff officers from HQ, Fifth Corps Area. These periods of provisional Active Duty were generally for command post exercises and major maneuvers. HQ, V Corps was fully activated on 20 October 1940, less Reserve personnel, at Camp Beauregard, LA, and thus passed outside the Fifth Corps Area.

Fifth Corps Area actually began functioning as a service command headquarters in October 1940 and was redesignated HQ, Fifth Corps Area Service Command in May 1941. It was further redesignated HQ, Fifth Service Command on 22 July 1942.

== Commanders 1920−1945 ==
Fifth Corps Area

- Major General George W. Read 20 August 1920–29 August 1922
- Brigadier General Dwight E. Aultman 29 August 1922–4 October 1922
- Major General James H. McRae 4 October 1922–7 February 1924
- Brigadier General Dwight E. Aultman 8 February 1924–12 July 1924 (second appointment)
- Major General Omar Bundy 12 July 1924–17 June 1925
- Brigadier General Dwight E. Aultman 17 June 1925–16 July 1925 (third appointment)
- Major General Robert L. Howze 16 July 1925–19 September 1926
- Brigadier General Dwight E. Aultman 19 September 1926–10 June 1927 (fourth appointment)
- Major General Dennis E. Nolan 10 June 1927–30 November 1931
- Major General Hugh A. Drum 3 December 1931–22 February 1933
- Brigadier General George H. Jamerson 22 February 1933–23 March 1933
- Major General George V. H. Moseley 26 March 1933–12 January 1934
- Brigadier General Julian R. Lindsey 12 January 1934–1 May 1934
- Major General Albert J. Bowley 1 May 1934–1 October 1935
- Brigadier General William K. Naylor 1 October 1935–25 January 1936
- Major General William E. Cole 25 January 1936–31 July 1938
- Major General Daniel Van Voorhis 1 August 1938–21 January 1940
- Major General David L. Stone 22 January 1940–25 April 1940
- Major General Campbell B. Hodges 1 June 1940–18 October 1940

Fifth Corps Area Service Command

- Colonel Edgar A. Fry 19 October 1940–1 November 1940
- Brigadier General Clement A. Trott 2 November 1940–29 September 1941
- Major General Daniel Van Voorhis 1 October 1941–July 1942 (second appointment)

Fifth Service Command

- Major General Daniel Van Voorhis (July 1942–24 October 1943)
- Major General Fred Clute Wallace (25 October 1942–2 December 1943)
- Major General James L. Collins (December 1943–February 1946)
