= Albert Jesse Bowley Sr. =

United States Army general

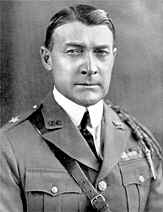
- Albert Jesse Bowley
- Born: November 24, 1875; Westminster, California
- Died: May 23, 1945 (aged 69); Northumberland County, Virginia
- Burial place: Arlington National Cemetery
- Military career
- Allegiance: United States of America
- Branch: United States Army
- Service years: 1897–1939
- Rank: Lieutenant General
- Service number: 0-256
- Commands: Fourth United States Army; Third Corps Area; Fifth Corps Area; Hawaiian Division; Eighth Corps Area (Acting); 2nd Infantry Division; Fourth Corps Area (Acting); Fort Bragg; VI Corps Artillery; 2nd Field Artillery Brigade; 17th Field Artillery Regiment
- Conflicts: Spanish–American War; World War I
- Awards: Distinguished Service Medal

Albert Jesse Bowley Sr. (November 24, 1875 – May 23, 1945) was a Lieutenant General in the United States Army. He was the son of First Lieutenant Freeman S. Bowley, who served in the Civil War with the 30th United States Colored Infantry.

== Early career ==
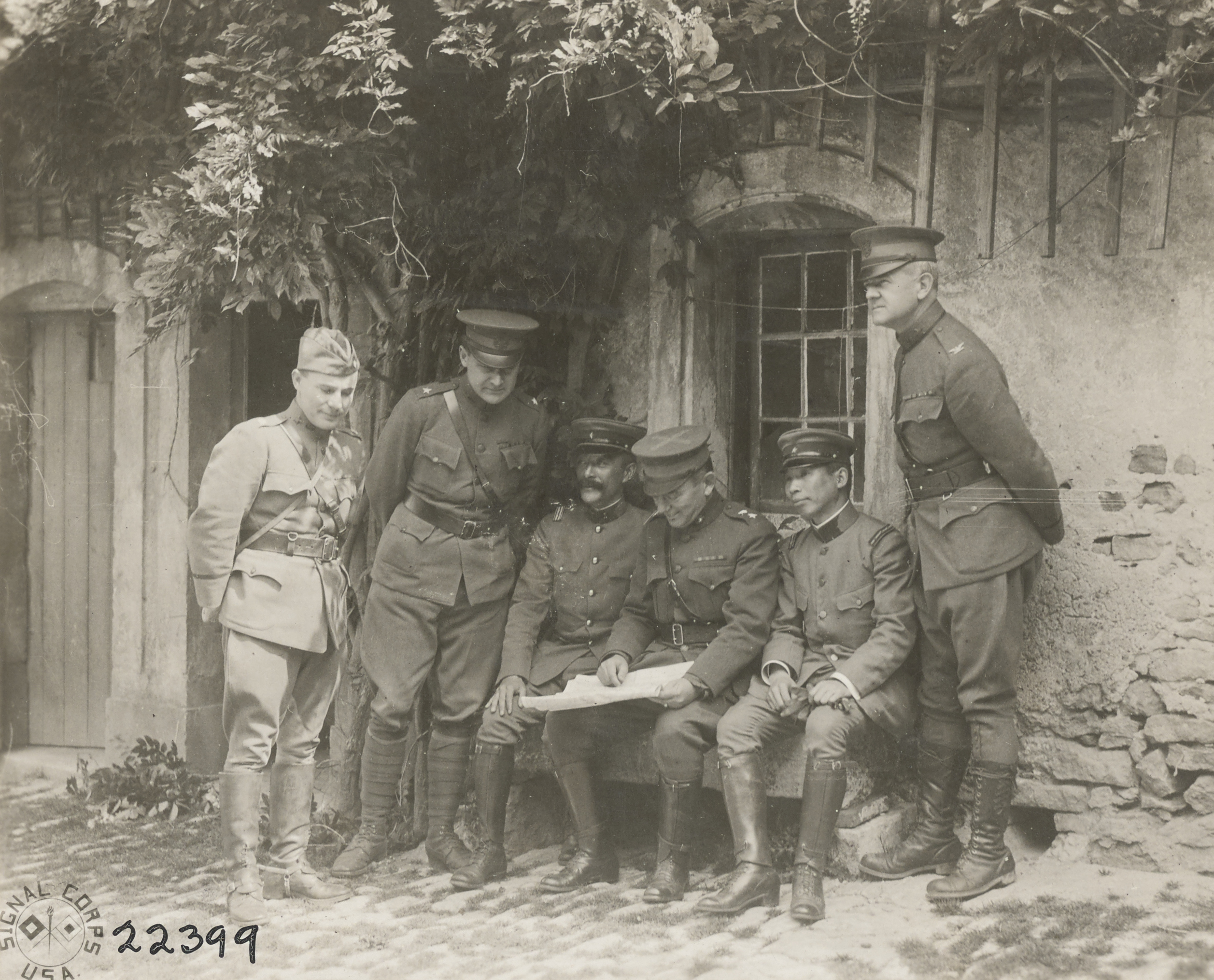
Senior officers of the U.S. 2nd Division at the front showing a Japanese delegation the enemy's position of the sector of the map. Brigadier General Albert J. Bowley is stood second on the left, while Marine Major General John A. Lejeune, commanding the 2nd Division, is sat third on the right.

Bowley was born on November 24, 1875, in Westminster, California, the son of Freeman Sparks Bowley and Flora Ella Pepper Bowley. His sister was actress Flora Juliet Bowley. He graduated from the United States Military Academy in 1897 and was commissioned as a second lieutenant of Artillery. He served in the Philippines during the Spanish–American War.

Between the Spanish–American War and World War I, Bowley served in a variety of command and staff assignments, including commander of a coast artillery company at Fort Greble, Rhode Island, aide-de-camp to Major General Frederick Dent Grant and military attaché in China. He also served on the Mexican border during the Punitive Expedition in pursuit of Pancho Villa of 1916 to 1917.

During World War I, Bowley successively commanded the 17th Field Artillery Regiment, 2nd Field Artillery Brigade, and VI Corps Artillery, additionally attaining the temporary rank of brigadier general in June 1918, and receiving the Army Distinguished Service Medal, The citation for which reads:

The President of the United States of America, authorized by Act of Congress, July 9, 1918, takes pleasure in presenting the Army Distinguished Service Medal to Brigadier General Albert J. Bowley, United States Army, for exceptionally meritorious and distinguished services to the Government of the United States, in a duty of great responsibility during World War I. General Bowley commanded the 17th Field Artillery, and later the 2d Field Artillery Brigade, in the active operations from July to November 1918. The artillery support under his direction in the engagements near Chateau-Thierry, near Soissons, those in the St. Mihiel salient, Blanc Mont Ridge, and in the Meuse-Argonne region were important factors in the great successes gained.

== Post World War I ==
In August 1919, Bowley reverted to his permanent rank of colonel. In 1920, he graduated from the United States Army War College. Bowley accepted a permanent promotion to brigadier general in May 1921. In 1921, he became commander of Fort Bragg, North Carolina, a post he held until 1928. During this assignment, Bowley was responsible for Fort Bragg's expansion into one of the Army's largest installations. While there, he also served as acting commander of the Fourth Corps Area four times between January 1925 and October 1927.

Bowley commanded the 2nd Infantry Division from March 1928 to April 1929, and was assigned as temporary commander of the Eighth Corps Area from April to December 1928. From 1929 to 1931 he was the Army's Assistant Army Chief of Staff for Personnel, G-1. In 1931, he was promoted to major general and was assigned to command the US Army's Hawaiian Division, where he remained until 1934. Bowley commanded the Fifth Corps Area from 1934 to 1935, and the Third Corps Area from 1935 to 1938. He was then commander of Fourth Army and Ninth Corps Area. He was promoted to lieutenant general on August 5, 1939, when the four Army commanders were temporarily promoted to the reestablished grade and title of lieutenant general, and served until he reached the mandatory retirement age of 64 on November 24 of the same year.

== Death and legacy ==
General Bowley died at his summer home in Northumberland County, Virginia, on May 22, 1945, and was interred in Section 3 Grave Site 1997-A of Arlington National Cemetery.

He was a hereditary companion of the California Commandery of the Military Order of the Loyal Legion of the United States by right of inheritance from his father was a veteran companion of the Order.

== Awards ==
Below is Lieutenant General Bowley's ribbon bar:

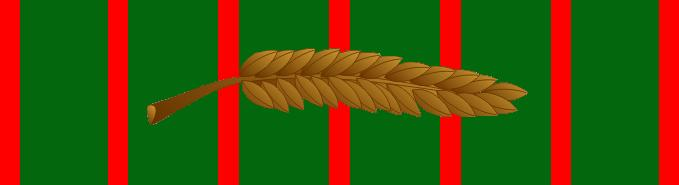

1st Row	Army Distinguished Service Medal			
2nd Row	Spanish Campaign Medal	Army of Cuban Occupation Medal	Philippine Campaign Medal	Mexican Border Service Medal
3rd Row	World War I Victory Medal with five battle clasps	Army of Occupation of Germany Medal	American Defense Service Medal	Officier de la Légion d'honneur
4th Row	French Croix de guerre 1914–1918 with Palm and Gilt Star	Commander of the Order of St. Olav	Order of the White Elephant, 4th Class	Medalla de la Solidaridad

== Dates of rank ==
No insignia	Cadet, United States Military Academy: June 15, 1893
No insignia in 1897	Second Lieutenant, Regular Army: June 11, 1897
	First Lieutenant, Regular Army: March 2, 1899
	Captain, Regular Army: August 1, 1901
	Major, Regular Army: February 9, 1912
	Lieutenant Colonel, Regular Army: July 1, 1916
	Colonel, Regular Army: May 15, 1917
	Brigadier General, National Army: June 26, 1918
	Colonel, Regular Army: August 15, 1919
	Brigadier General, Regular Army: April 19, 1921
	Major General, Regular Army: February 20, 1931
	Lieutenant General, Regular Army: August 5, 1939
	Lieutenant General, Retired List: November 24, 1939

== Bibliography ==
- Biographical Register of the Officers and Graduates of the U.S. Military Academy, by George Washington Cullum, Volume V, 1910 OCLC 1417240
- The Chicago Blue Book of Selected Names of Chicago and Suburban Towns, published by The Chicago Directory Company, 1909, page 103
- Davis, Henry Blaine Jr. (1998). Generals in Khaki. Pentland Press, Inc. ISBN 1571970886. OCLC 40298151.
- Clark, George B. (2007). The Second Infantry Division in World War I. McFarland. ISBN 9780786429608.
- Commendations of Second Division, American Expeditionary Forces, published by Second Division Association, 1919
- U.S. Army Recruiting News, U.S. Army Adjutant General's Office, 1931
- The Chicago Daily News Almanac and Year Book for 1937, published by Chicago Daily News, 1937, page 214
- U.S. Army Directory, U.S. Army Adjutant General's Office, 1939
- "Gen. A.J. Bowley Dead In Virginia," New York Times, May 24, 1945, http://select.nytimes.com/gst/abstract.html?res=F20E15FD3E5F1B7B93C6AB178ED85F418485F9
- U.S. Air Force General Officer Biographies, Albert J. Bowley Jr., https://web.archive.org/web/20090910215827/http://www.af.mil/information/bios/bio_print.asp?bioID=4752&page=1
