= Anson Vasco Call II =

American architect

Anson Vasco Call

Mayor of Afton, Wyoming
- In office 1902-1904, 1912 – 1914, 1924, 1925, 1927
- Preceded by: None

Personal details
- Born: 1855 Willard, Utah Territory, United States
- Died: October 12, 1944 (aged 88–89) Afton, Wyoming, United States

Anson Vasco Call II (1855 – October 12, 1944) played a major role in founding Afton, Wyoming. On July 5 2008, he was one of six honored at the dedication of Afton's new Civic Center.

He was born in Willard, Utah Territory. During his early boyhood, he worked in the fields gleaning wheat. In 1864, his father Anson Call was called to serve a mission in England by the Church of Jesus Christ of Latter-day Saints. While returning home in 1867, he died at Rock Creek, Wyoming.

At the age of seventeen, Anson was enrolled in the University of Utah, graduating with first class in 1875. There, he met Alice Jeanette Farnham, whom he married four years later in Salt Lake City, Utah, on May 17, 1876.

Anson was a skilled carpenter and worked on their new home most mornings before walking three miles to Centerville for his teaching job. He served as the superintendent of schools and stake president of the Mutual Improvement Association. When Anson considered taking a second wife, he chose Emily Stayner, Alice's cousin who had grown up in the same home. However, out of consideration for Alice, she refused him, saying "she would as soon be tenth as second." Emily eventually became his third wife. Anson married Lucy King in 1882.

Severe persecution for practising polygamy made it necessary for him to leave Utah, so he served a mission in England. He left in February 1885. Some of the first Elders he met were from Davis County. Among them were George Osmond, with whom he would later serve in the Star Valley Stake Presidency, and Daniel H. Wells.

In 1886, Anson arrived back in Utah and found his family in good health, but persecution of polygamists was still occurring. Because of this, he has to escape to Chesterfield, Idaho, where he lived with his uncle Chester. Many of his relatives lived in and around Chesterfield, and Emily came to teach music to them. It was there that Anson heard about Star Valley, Wyoming, particularly its seclusion and the friendly attitude the governor had towards polygamists. Anson, Alice and their children set out with Chester's brother, Bowen, to try pioneering in Star Valley. They hauled logs and built two cabins: a one-room cabin for Anson and a two-room cabin for Bowen. At that time, there were about ten families living in similar cabins in the Afton town site. On November 16, 1887, his uncle, Chester Call, arrived with Bowen's wife, Theresa, his daughter, Theresa's mother, Pamela Thompson, and Anson's wife, Alice, and her daughters, Maud and Ella. They came in one light wagon with very few supplies.

The cabin was small (14x16 feet) with a small stove, a wooden rocking chair, a few cooking utensils, bedding, and dishes. Boards were nailed into the wall for a bunk bed. Winter supplies were piled in the corner, and the south end of the room was reserved for the carpenter's workbench and tools. Anson made a turning lathe entirely of native wood, powered by a foot treadle. He made furniture to trade for meat, milk, hay, and buckskin. Anson was offered a school teaching position for fifteen to twenty students but gave the job to Bowen, who had no other means of employment.

Anson's brother, Joe, came with his family. The following year, they built the first framed buildings with shingle roofs. For several years, Anson and Joe built many structures of importance in the valley. They were also partners in the first furniture store and machine company. Anson worked as a teacher in the winter and built buildings in the summer. In 1892, he designed and supervised the construction of the Afton Ward chapel. That same year, the Star Valley Stake of the Church of Jesus Christ of Latter-day Saints was organized with George Osmond as president, William Walton Burton as first counsellor, and Anson Vasco Call II as second counsellor. In August 1904, the cornerstone was laid for a new tabernacle, and Anson served as architect and builder. The tabernacle was dedicated in August 1909. He also built and sold many homes in the area. He built one for his first family on the corner of Madison Street and 3rd Avenue, and he built a new home on Fifth Avenue for his fourth wife, Margaret Ann Hepworth.

On September 13, 1901, a mass meeting of Afton citizens was held to select a committee to incorporate the town. Anson Vasco Call II, William Henry Kennington, and Osborne Low were selected. Anson Vasco Call II was elected the first mayor and began serving in 1902. In all, he served nine terms as Mayor of Afton (1902, 1903, 1904, 1912, 1913, 1914, 1924, 1925, and 1927).

Anson personally supervised the installation of the first city water system in 1913. He served for many years as the Federal Land Bank Appraiser for Lincoln, Uinta, and Teton counties. He also served as the Government Weather Observer.

Anson Vasco Call II died Thursday, October 12, 1944, in Afton, Wyoming. On October 17, a large crowd of his family attended the funeral; twenty-nine of thirty-seven children were there. He was buried in the Afton Cemetery.
