= Flora Juliet Bowley =

American actress (1881–1966)

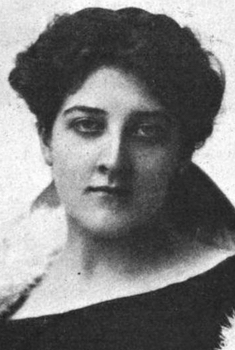
- Flora Juliet Bowley, from a 1906 publication.
- Born: April 29, 1881; San Francisco, California
- Died: December 30, 1966 (aged 85); Monterey, California
- Other names: Flora Hoffman
- Occupation: Actress
- Relatives: Albert Jesse Bowley Sr. (brother)

Flora Juliet Bowley (April 29, 1881 – December 30, 1966) was an American actress.

== Early life ==
Flora Juliet Bowley was born in San Francisco in 1881, the daughter of Freeman Sparks Bowley (1846–1903) and Flora Ella Pepper Bowley (1846–1939). Her father, who briefly led the 30th U.S. Colored Infantry regiment and was a prisoner-of-war in the American Civil War, was a railroad engineer who wrote several books on military topics, and a memoir. Her mother, known as "Mother Bowley", was a beloved maternal figure at San Francisco's Presidio. One of her brothers was U.S. Army general Albert Jesse Bowley Sr. She graduated from Smith College in 1904.

== Career ==
Bowley had a short but successful career as a stage actress. She appeared in The Fortunes of the King and The Bachelor's Romance in Northampton, Massachusetts in 1905, and The Lion and the Mouse in Chicago and New York in 1906. She starred with Robert Edeson in Classmates on Broadway in 1907. She was said to resemble the actress Mary Mannering, but they were not (as some rumors held) related to each other.

== Personal life ==
Bowley married Julius Theodore Charles Hoffman (1848-1935) in 1914. The Hoffmans had four children. Flora Juliet Bowley Hoffman died in 1966, in Monterey, California, aged 85 years.
