= Willard, Utah =

City in Utah, United States

- City
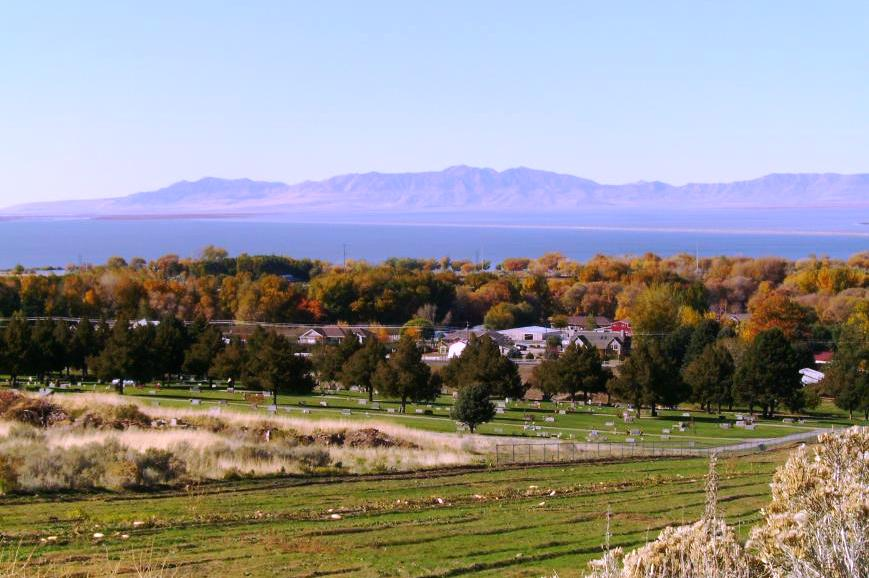
- City of Willard, with Willard Bay and the Promontory Mountains in the background

- Location in Box Elder County and the state of Utah

- Location of Utah in the United States
- Coordinates: 41°24′53″N 112°02′41″W
- Country: United States
- State: Utah
- County: Box Elder
- Settled: 1851
- Incorporated: 1870
- Named for: Willard Richards

Area
  - Total: 7.08 sq mi (18.35 km^{2})
  - Land: 5.62 sq mi (14.55 km^{2})
  - Water: 1.47 sq mi (3.80 km^{2})
- Elevation: 4,288 ft (1,307 m)

Population (2020)
  - Total: 1,978
  - Density: 348.6/sq mi (134.58/km^{2})
- Time zone: UTC-7 (Mountain (MST))
  - Summer (DST): UTC-6 (MDT)
- ZIP code: 84340
- Area code: 435
- FIPS code: 49-84710
- GNIS feature ID: 2412265
- Website: www.willardcityut.gov

Willard (Shoshoni: Sogo-timp-bow ya) is a city in Box Elder County, Utah, United States. The population was 1,978 at the 2020 census.

== Geography ==
Willard is located in southeastern Box Elder County and is bordered by the city of Perry to the north and the unincorporated community of South Willard to the south. The east edge of the city is bordered by Cache National Forest in the Wasatch Range, and the west side extends into Willard Bay, a freshwater reservoir built out of the Great Salt Lake. Willard Bay State Park is located within the city limits along the shore of Willard Bay.

Interstate highways 15 and 84 pass through the western side of the city, with access from Exit 357. U.S. Route 89 is the city's Main Street.

According to the United States Census Bureau, the city has a total area of 7.2 square miles (18.6 km^{2}), of which 5.7 square miles (14.7 km^{2}) is land and 1.5 square miles (3.9 km^{2}), or 21.16%, is water.

== History ==
In 1851, several companies of Mormon settlers were sent north from Salt Lake City to a northern bay of the Great Salt Lake called Bear River Bay. In 1957 the US Corps of Engineers built a fresh water lake which is now called Willard Bay. A company of nineteen located on North Willow Creek, 7 miles (11 km) south of the site where Brigham City would be established. Two years later, the infant community relocated two miles further south, and a fort wall was built due to the possibility of attacks by the Shohone and their allies. Willard's first settlers were mostly of Welsh, English, Scottish and Dutch descent. Most were farmers, but some were merchants, carpenters, blacksmiths and school teachers. Historically, the economy of Willard centered on agriculture, with fruit crops being the major product. Gravel excavation and worked stone have also been a significant source of income.

Henry G. Sherwood surveyed North Willow Creek in 1851. The community was renamed Willard in honor of Willard Richards (1804-1854), a recently deceased Apostle of the LDS Church and counselor to Brigham Young, in 1859. Willard received its charter as a city in 1870.

Gifted stonemason Shadrack Jones took advantage of local rock cliffs and the alluvial fan exposed as ancient Lake Bonneville receded. Between 1862 and 1883, he mined the local stone and built single-family homes. Over thirty still stand and many are listed on the National Register of Historic Places as contributing buildings in the Willard Historic District. Other early structures included a brick yard, the first grist mill in Box Elder County, and a number of molasses mills.

== Demographics ==
Historical population
Census	Pop.	Note	%±
1870	552		—
1880	412		−25.4%
1890	492		19.4%
1900	580		17.9%
1910	577		−0.5%
1920	651		12.8%
1930	561		−13.8%
1940	541		−3.6%
1950	548		1.3%
1960	814		48.5%
1970	1,045		28.4%
1980	1,241		18.8%
1990	1,298		4.6%
2000	1,630		25.6%
2010	1,772		8.7%
2020	1,978		11.6%
U.S. Decennial Census

=== 2020 census ===
As of the 2020 census, Willard had a population of 1,978. The median age was 37.7 years, with 27.8% of residents under the age of 18 and 15.5% of residents aged 65 years or older. For every 100 females there were 105.6 males, and for every 100 females age 18 and over there were 104.0 males.

67.2% of residents lived in urban areas, while 32.8% lived in rural areas.

There were 645 households in Willard, of which 36.6% had children under the age of 18 living in them. Of all households, 69.5% were married-couple households, 14.0% were households with a male householder and no spouse or partner present, and 14.4% were households with a female householder and no spouse or partner present. About 17.1% of all households were made up of individuals and 7.2% had someone living alone who was 65 years of age or older.

There were 681 housing units, of which 5.3% were vacant. The homeowner vacancy rate was 1.3% and the rental vacancy rate was 11.3%.

Racial composition as of the 2020 census
Race	Number	Percent
White	1,841	93.1%
Black or African American	3	0.2%
American Indian and Alaska Native	6	0.3%
Asian	7	0.4%
Native Hawaiian and Other Pacific Islander	3	0.2%
Some other race	36	1.8%
Two or more races	82	4.1%
Hispanic or Latino (of any race)	113	5.7%

=== 2010 census ===
As of the 2010 census, there were 1,772 people, 600 households, and 485 families residing in the city. The population density was 310.9 people per square mile (120.5/km^{2}), and there were 633 housing units at an average density of 111.1 per square mile (43.1/km^{2}). The racial makeup of the city was 95.4% White, 0.1% African American, 0.3% Native American, 0.8% Asian, 0.1% Pacific Islander, 1.2% from other races, and 2.1% from two or more races. Hispanic or Latino of any race were 3.9% of the population.

There were 600 households, out of which 35.2% had children under the age of 18 living with them, 68.3% were married couples living together, 7.7% had a female householder with no husband present, and 19.2% were non-families. 15.8% of all households were made up of individuals, and 7.3% had someone living alone who was 65 years of age or older. The average household size was 2.95 and the average family size was 3.31.

In the city, the population was spread out, with 28.9% under the age of 18, 8.1% from 18 to 24, 23.8% from 25 to 44, 27.2% from 45 to 64, and 12% who were 65 years of age or older. The median age was 34.3 years. For every 100 females, there were 98.2 males. For every 100 females age 18 and over, there were 99.7 males.

=== 2000 census ===
In 2000 the median income for a household in the city was $52,150, and the median income for a family was $57,841. Males had a median income of $40,625 versus $26,364 for females. The per capita income for the city was $17,592. About 5.1% of families and 7.2% of the population were below the poverty line, including 7.9% of those under age 18 and 4.7% of those age 65 or over.

== Notable people ==
- Anson Vasco Call II, first mayor of Afton, Wyoming (served nine terms)
- William E. Cole, Major general during both World Wars
- Melba Rae, actress
- Evan Stephens, Mormon Tabernacle Choir director

== See also ==
- List of cities and towns in Utah
