= Perry, Utah =

City in Utah, United States

- City
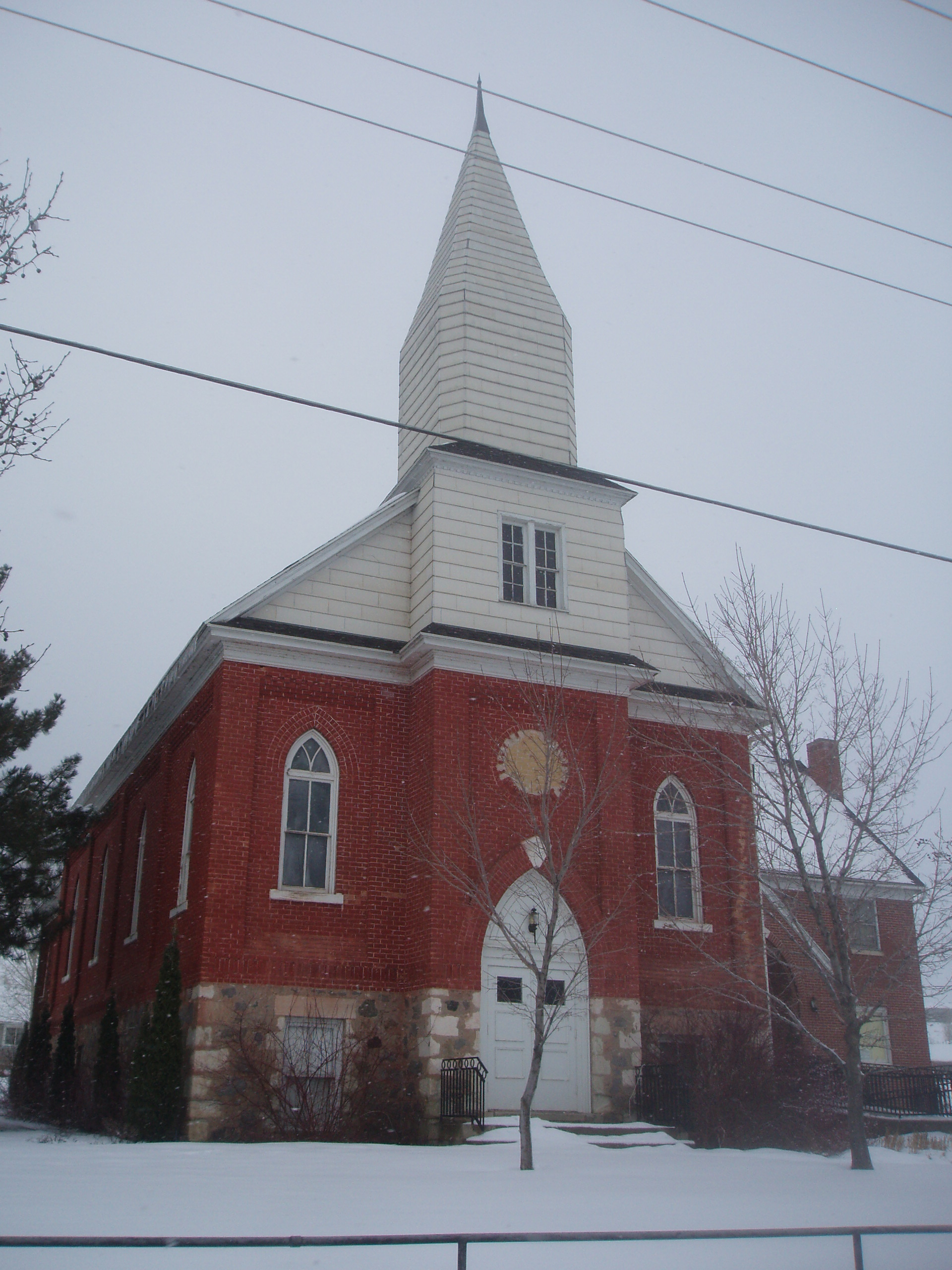
- The Heritage Community Theatre, a Perry landmark
- Motto: "Building a Community Together"
- Location in Box Elder County and the state of Utah

- Location of Utah in the United States
- Coordinates: 41°27′53″N 112°02′24″W
- Country: United States
- State: Utah
- County: Box Elder
- Settled: 1853
- Named for: Gustavus Adolphus Perry

Area
  - Total: 8.00 sq mi (20.72 km^{2})
  - Land: 8.00 sq mi (20.72 km^{2})
  - Water: 0.0039 sq mi (0.01 km^{2})
- Elevation: 4,301 ft (1,311 m)

Population (2020)
  - Total: 5,555
  - Density: 656.1/sq mi (253.32/km^{2})
- Time zone: UTC-7 (Mountain (MST))
  - Summer (DST): UTC-6 (MDT)
- ZIP code: 84302
- Area code: 435
- FIPS code: 49-59390
- GNIS feature ID: 2411405
- Website: www.perrycityut.gov

Perry is a city in Box Elder County, Utah, United States. The population was 5,555 at the 2020 census.

== History ==
Land in the area now known as Perry was first claimed in 1851 by Orrin Porter Rockwell and his brother Merritt, at a place now called Porter Spring. However, they only laid claim to the land and did not build a residence. Settlement by LDS pioneers began in 1853, when William Plummer Tippets built a cabin at the settlement known as "Three Mile Creek", there being a creek three miles south of Box Elder (now Brigham City). Another settlement known as "Welsh Settlement" was midway between Three Mile Creek and Box Elder, which joined with Three Mile Creek in 1869. In 1898 the community was renamed Perry after Gustavus Adolphus Perry and his family, who were among the early settlers.

In 1854 Gustavus Adolphus Perry was made LDS branch president at the location. It had various branch presidents from then until 1877. In 1877 it was made a ward with Orrin Alonzo Perry as bishop. In 1930 there were 341 inhabitants in Perry. It still only had enough Latter-day Saints for one ward. In the spring of 2008 the Perry Utah Stake was created by a division of the Willard Utah Stake. This stake consists of nine wards, but one of the wards in the Willard Stake is a Perry Ward as well.

In June 1896 a partially completed reservoir at the mouth of Three Mile Creek Canyon (now Perry Canyon) overflowed, flooding much of the town, destroying homes and covering farms with mud and gravel. A second flood in 1923 caused less damage.

== Geography ==
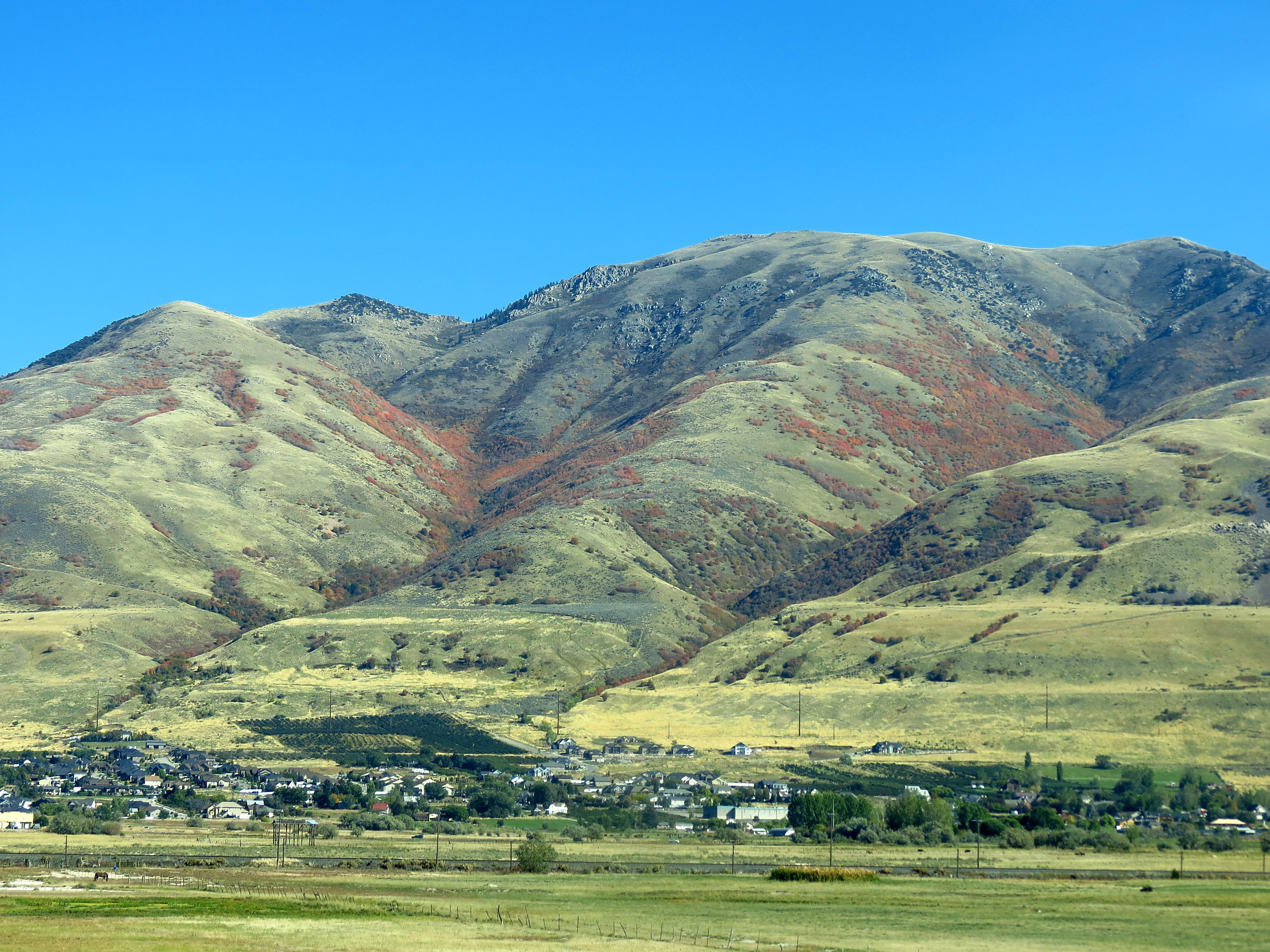
Looking east from I-15 toward Perry, Utah and the Wasatch Mountains, October 2014

Perry is located in southeastern Box Elder County and is bordered by Brigham City to the north and Willard to the south. The east side of the city is bordered by Cache National Forest at the northern end of the Wasatch Range.

Interstate Highways 15 and 84 run through the western side of the city, with access south of the city from Exit 357 in Willard and north of the city from Exit 362 through Brigham City. U.S. Route 89 runs through the center of the city.

The city has historically been primarily rural and agricultural, consisting of family dairies, cattle farms, and fruit orchards, with many fruit stands along U.S. 89 through Box Elder County to southern Idaho known as Utah's Fruit Belt. It is now primarily a suburban residential community, with some commercial activity along the northern border with Brigham City and along U.S. 89.

According to the United States Census Bureau, the city has a total area of 8.0 square miles (20.8 km^{2}), all land.

== Demographics ==
Historical population
Census	Pop.	Note	%±
1900	260		—
1910	292		12.3%
1920	367		25.7%
1930	341		−7.1%
1940	383		12.3%
1950	449		17.2%
1960	587		30.7%
1970	909		54.9%
1980	1,084		19.3%
1990	1,211		11.7%
2000	2,383		96.8%
2010	4,512		89.3%
2020	5,555		23.1%
U.S. Decennial Census

=== 2020 census ===
As of the 2020 census, Perry had a population of 5,555. The median age was 34.4 years. 33.8% of residents were under the age of 18 and 13.3% of residents were 65 years of age or older. For every 100 females there were 99.5 males, and for every 100 females age 18 and over there were 98.4 males age 18 and over.

93.8% of residents lived in urban areas, while 6.2% lived in rural areas.

There were 1,644 households in Perry, of which 46.1% had children under the age of 18 living in them. Of all households, 75.2% were married-couple households, 9.4% were households with a male householder and no spouse or partner present, and 13.3% were households with a female householder and no spouse or partner present. About 12.7% of all households were made up of individuals and 5.8% had someone living alone who was 65 years of age or older.

There were 1,695 housing units, of which 3.0% were vacant. The homeowner vacancy rate was 0.9% and the rental vacancy rate was 6.2%.

Racial composition as of the 2020 census
Race	Number	Percent
White	5,114	92.1%
Black or African American	8	0.1%
American Indian and Alaska Native	22	0.4%
Asian	41	0.7%
Native Hawaiian and Other Pacific Islander	5	0.1%
Some other race	98	1.8%
Two or more races	267	4.8%
Hispanic or Latino (of any race)	327	5.9%

=== 2010 census ===
As of the census of 2010, there were 4,512 people, 1,373 households, and 1,179 families residing in the city. The population density was 564 people per square mile (216.9/km^{2}). There were 1,427 housing units at an average density of 178.4 per square mile (68.6/km^{2}). The racial makeup of the city was 94.5% White, 0.1% African American, 0.7% Native American, 0.7% Asian, 0.3% Pacific Islander, 1.8% from other races, and 1.8% from two or more races. Hispanic or Latino of any race were 4.6% of the population.

There were 1,373 households, out of which 46.5% had children under the age of 18 living with them, 76.3% were married couples living together, 6.9% had a female householder with no husband present, and 14.1% were non-families. 12.0% of all households were made up of individuals, and 5.3% had someone living alone who was 65 years of age or older. The average household size was 3.29 and the average family size was 3.60.

In the city, the population was spread out, with 36.1% under the age of 18, 6.5% from 18 to 24, 27.2% from 25 to 44, 19.1% from 45 to 64, and 11.1% who were 65 years of age or older. The median age was 31.1 years. For every 100 females, there were 101 males. For every 100 females age 18 and over, there were 99.4 males.

=== 2000 census ===
During the census of 2000, the median income for a household in the city was $52,500, and the median income for a family was $57,857. Males had a median income of $41,761 versus $26,806 for females. The per capita income for the city was $19,092. About 1.2% of families and 2.2% of the population were below the poverty line, including 2.9% of those under age 18 and 4.0% of those age 65 or over.

== Education ==
Perry is part of the Box Elder School District. The city has one public, and one public charter, elementary school. Students attend schools in Willard and Brigham City for other grades.

- Three Mile Creek Elementary
- Promontory School of Expeditionary Learning

== Recreation ==
The city has four parks, one with a baseball diamond and room for soccer, one with two soccer fields, and one a nature park. Trails for hiking lead up the canyons into Cache National Forest, and connect with the Bonneville Shoreline Trail.

== See also ==
- List of cities and towns in Utah
