= Willard Bay =

Reservoir in the Great Salt Lake, Utah

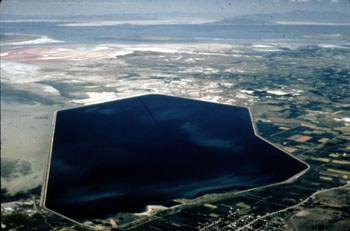

- Location within Utah Location within the United States
- Interactive map of Willard Bay
- Location: Box Elder County, Utah
- Coordinates: 41°22′45″N 112°07′55″W
- Type: Reservoir
- Etymology: Nearby town of Willard, Utah
- Part of: Great Salt Lake
- River sources: Willard Creek; Willard Canal
- Basin countries: United States
- Managing agency: Utah State Parks and Recreation
- Built: 1964
- Construction engineer: U.S. Bureau of Reclamation
- Surface area: 9,900-acre (40 km^{2})
- Max. depth: 36 feet (11 m)
- Water volume: 215,200 acre-feet (270 million cubic meters)
- Surface elevation: 4,200 feet (1,300 m)
- References: U.S. Geological Survey Geographic Names Information System: Willard Bay

Willard Bay is a man-made fresh water reservoir in the Great Salt Lake, in northern Utah. The bay was separated from the Great Salt Lake in 1964, and has since served as a source of irrigation water and recreation for the northern Wasatch Front metro area.

== Geography ==
Willard Bay is a 9,900-acre (40 km^{2}) freshwater reservoir located in eastern Box Elder County, Utah, north-west of the city of Ogden, on the north-eastern floodplains of the Great Salt Lake.

The reservoir is operated by the Weber Basin Water Conservancy District and recreation activities are administered by Utah State Parks and Recreation. Fish in Willard Bay include black crappie, walleye, wiper, smallmouth bass, channel catfish, bluegill, and gizzard shad (which are unlawful to possess). At an elevation of about 4,200 feet (1,300 m), the area around Willard Bay features cottonwood and other high desert trees. In winter, the area is a wildlife area for watching nesting eagles.

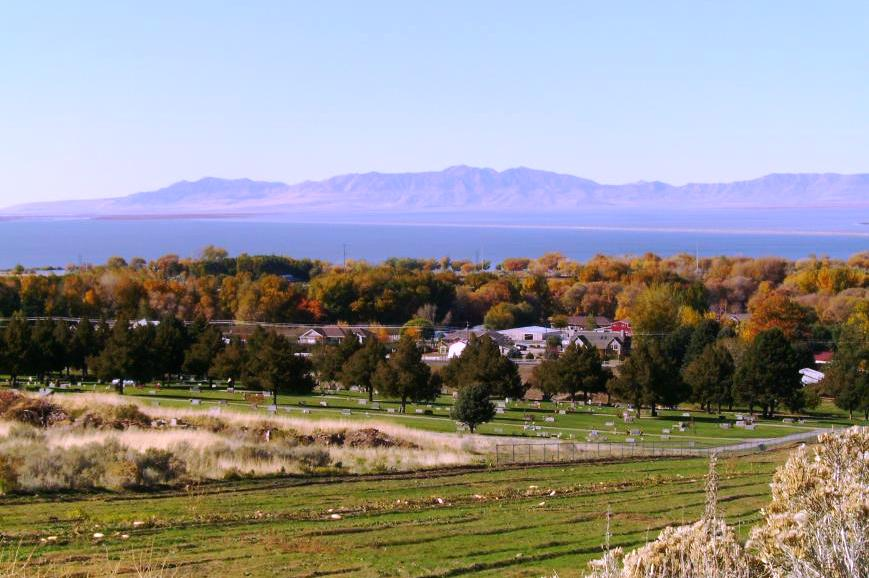

== History ==
In 1949, U.S. Senator Arthur Vivian Watkins, a Republican from Utah who served from 1946 to 1959, passed through Congress the Weber Basin Project. This project called for the creation of a reservoir to store surplus water from the Ogden and Weber rivers that could later be accessed for use on farmland.

The U.S. Bureau of Reclamation designed and constructed a 36-foot (11 m)-high earth-filled dike to create the 26.4-square-mile (68 km^{2}) enclosure. The dike, which impounds 215,200 acre-feet (270 million cubic meters) of water, was completed in 1964 by the W.W. Clyde Company, and was named the Arthur V. Watkins Dam. The resulting reservoir was then drained of salt water and refilled with fresh, directly from the Weber River. The bay was named after the nearby town of Willard, which itself was named after the LDS apostle Willard Richards.

A bill in Congress, H.R. 839 and S. 512, The Arthur V. Watkins Dam Enlargement Act, was introduced in the 2007 session to authorize a feasibility study to enlarge the dam. While the bill passed the House of Representatives, it was suspended in the Senate and never became law.

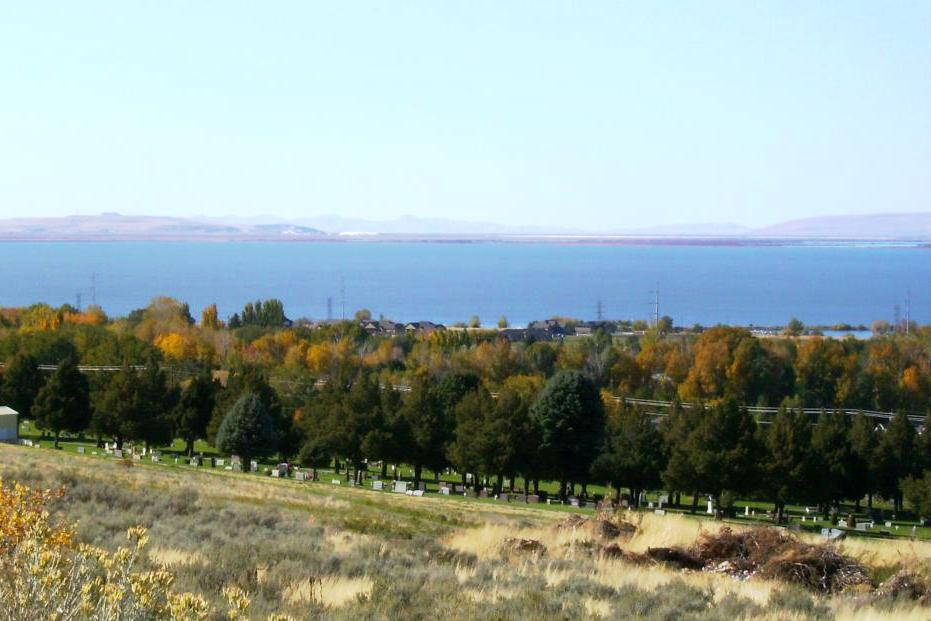

== Willard Bay State Park ==
Willard Bay State Park is located on the eastern shore of Willard Bay. It features two state-owned facilities. The north marina is 15 miles (24 km) north of Ogden. It has 62 campsites, restrooms, showers, full RV hook-ups, and seasonal/transient boat slip rentals. The south marina is 8 miles (13 km) north of Ogden. It is only open April through October, and features 30 campsites with restrooms, 24 of which have full hookups.

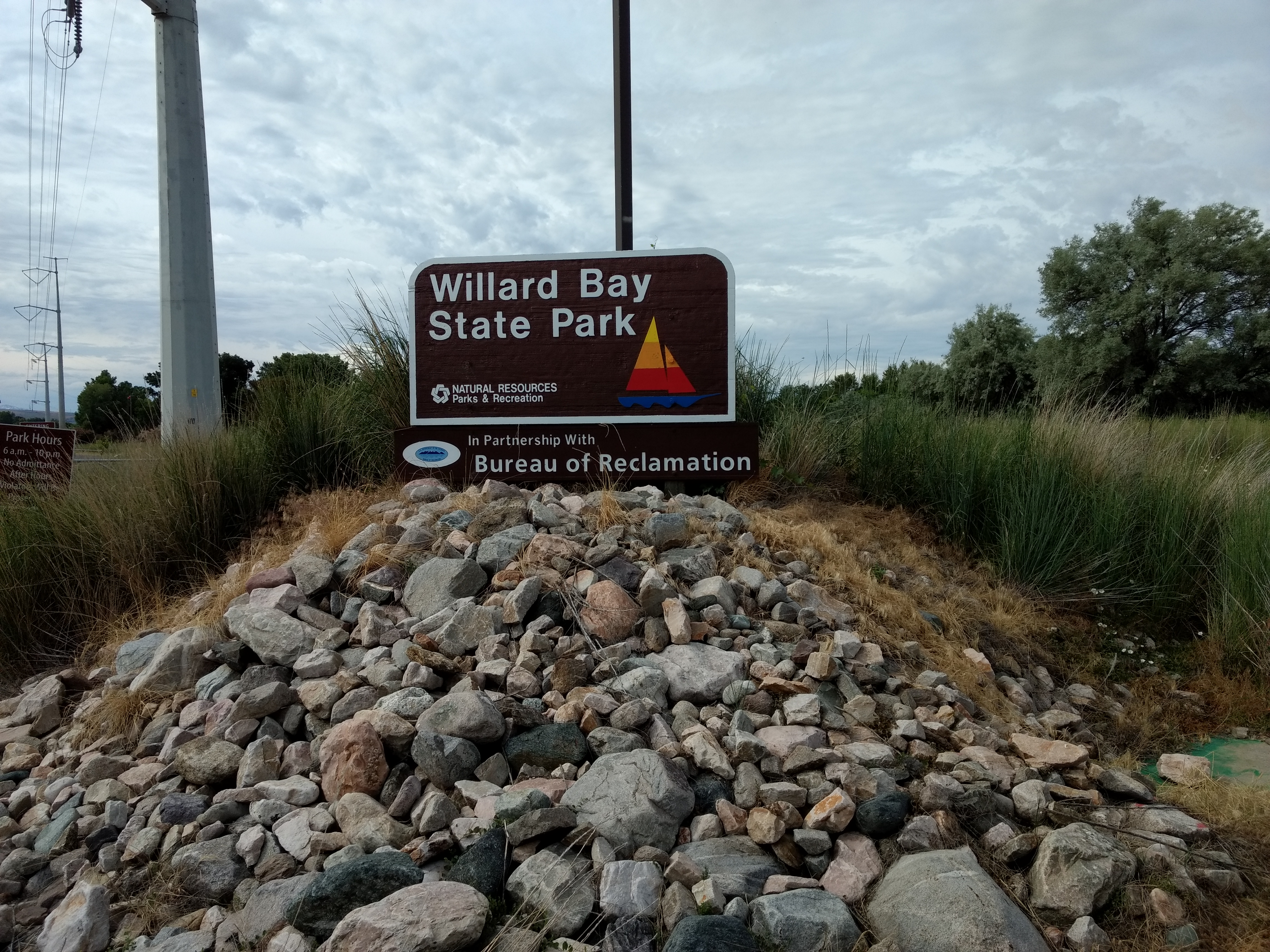
