= William K. Naylor =

US Army brigadier general (1874–1942)

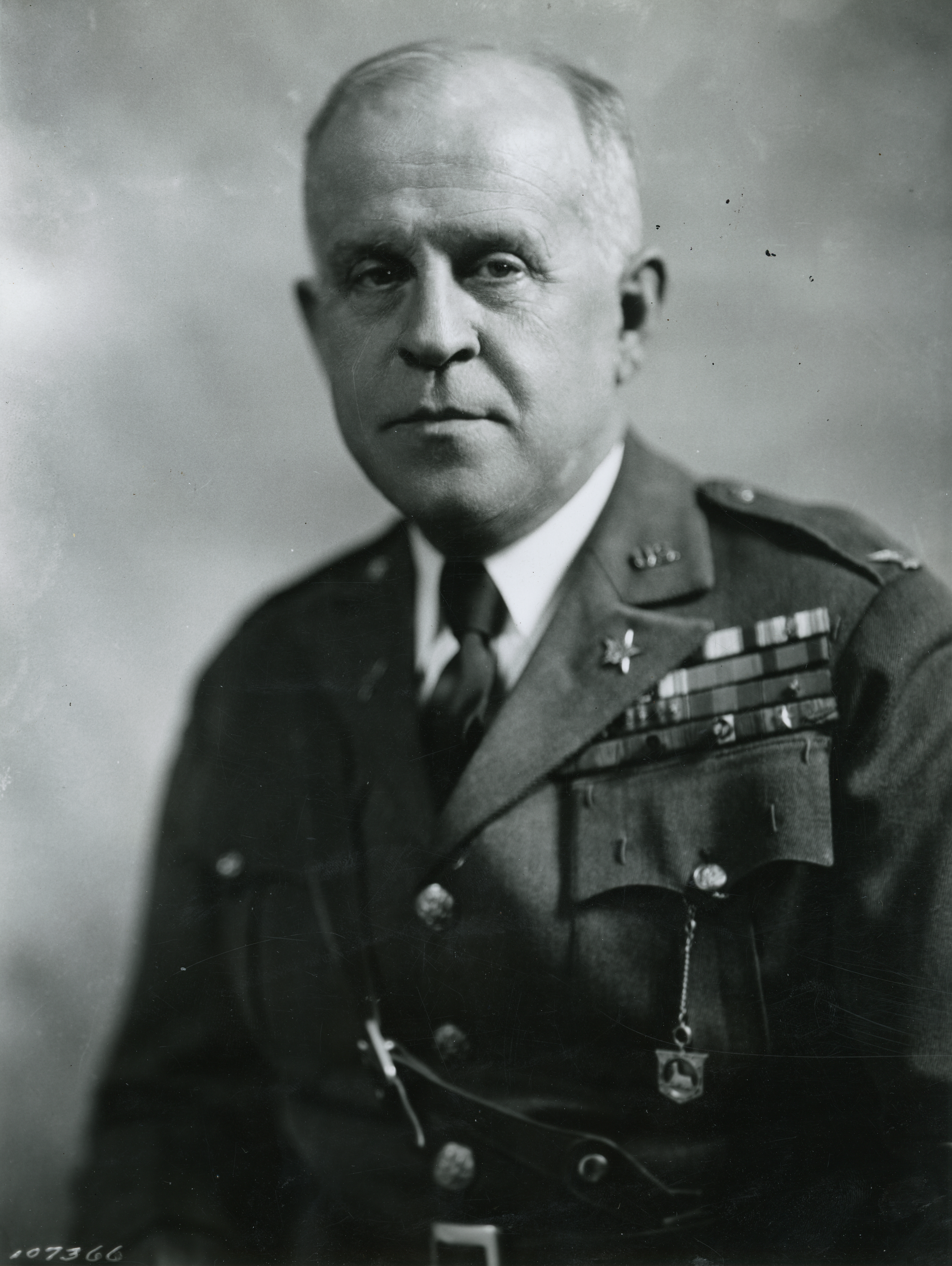
- Naylor as Second Corps Area chief of staff in 1930
- Born: 24 November 1874; Bloomington, Illinois, US
- Died: 3 August 1942 (aged 67); Farmington, Pennsylvania, US
- Burial place: Arlington National Cemetery
- Alma mater: Michigan Military Academy; University of Minnesota; United States Army Command and General Staff College; United States Army War College
- Spouse: Margaret Howard Wagner (m. 1904–1942)
- Children: 3
- Relatives: Arthur L. Wagner (father-in-law); Halstead C. Fowler (son-in-law)
- Military career
- Service: Minnesota National Guard; United States Army
- Service years: 1894–1898 (National Guard); 1898–1938 (Army)
- Rank: Brigadier General
- Service number: 0-635
- Unit: US Army Infantry Branch
- Commands: Company E, 3rd Minnesota Infantry Regiment; Company F, 9th Infantry Regiment; US Army General Staff School; US Army War Plans Division; 15th Infantry Regiment; 13th Infantry Regiment; Fort Warren; Fort Adams; Civilian Conservation Corps, Second Corps Area; Army Reserve Officers' Training Corps, University of Illinois Urbana-Champaign; Fort Benjamin Harrison; Fifth Corps Area
- Conflicts: Spanish–American War; Philippine–American War; China Relief Expedition; World War I
- Awards: Army Distinguished Service Medal; Silver Star; Order of St Michael and St George (Commander) (Great Britain); Order of the Crown of Italy (Commander); Legion of Honor (Officer) (France); Croix de Guerre (France)
- Other work: Author

William K. Naylor (24 November 1874 – 3 August 1942) was a career officer in the United States Army. A veteran of the Spanish–American War, Philippine–American War, Boxer Rebellion, and World War I, he attained the rank of brigadier general. Naylor served from 1898 to 1938, and his command assignments included the 15th Infantry Regiment and 13th Infantry Regiment. He was a recipient of the Army Distinguished Service Medal and the Silver Star, in addition to numerous foreign awards and decorations.

A native of Bloomington, Illinois, Naylor graduated from Michigan Military Academy in 1894 and the University of Minnesota Law School in 1898. Naylor served in the Minnesota National Guard while attending law school, and he volunteered for federal service during the Spanish–American War. Commissioned in the army as a second lieutenant later that year, he went on to serve in the Philippine–American War and China Relief Expedition. Naylor was a highly regarded military historian and strategist, and he taught at several army schools, in addition to authoring numerous books and journal articles. During World War I, Naylor attained the rank of brigadier general as chief of staff of the 33rd Division, III Corps and IX Corps.

After the First World War, Naylor's assignments included command of the: US Army General Staff School; US Army War Plans Division; 15th Infantry Regiment; 13th Infantry Regiment and Fort Warren, Massachusetts; Civilian Conservation Corps, Second Corps Area; Army Reserve Officers' Training Corps, University of Illinois Urbana-Champaign; Fort Benjamin Harrison; and Fifth Corps Area. Naylor retired in 1938. He died in Farmington, Pennsylvania on 3 August 1942 and was buried at Arlington National Cemetery.

== Early life ==
William Keith Naylor was born in Bloomington, Illinois on 24 November 1874, the son of William Alexander Naylor and Genevieve Charlotte (Hay) Naylor. Naylor's father was a manager and executive for the American Express Company, and as he moved due to reassignment and promotions, Naylor was raised in Bloomington, Burlington, Iowa, and Saint Paul, Minnesota. From 1890 to 1894, he was a student at the Michigan Military Academy. After graduating, he applied for admission to the United States Military Academy; he was accepted as an alternate, but a vacancy did not occur.

Naylor attended the University of Minnesota Law School while serving as a first lieutenant and captain in the Minnesota National Guard's Company E, 3rd Infantry Regiment. In February 1898, Naylor was a delegate to Saint Paul's city Republican convention. Naylor graduated in 1898 with an LL.B. degree and was admitted to the bar.

== Start of career ==
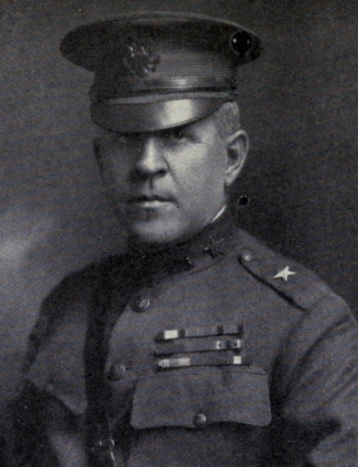
Naylor as a brigadier general during World War I

At the start of the Spanish–American War in April 1898, Naylor organized a volunteer company made up of University of Minnesota students and members of his National Guard unit; the members elected him as captain. This unit was not accepted for federal service, and in May, Naylor accepted appointment as the 3rd Regiment's commissary officer with the rank of first lieutenant. The 3rd Minnesota was subsequently federalized as the 14th Minnesota Volunteer Infantry, and Naylor served with the 14th during its pre-deployment organization and training at Camp George H. Thomas, Georgia. Naylor was serving as a second lieutenant in the 14th Minnesota's Company L in July when he resigned so he could accept a commission as a second lieutenant in the regular army's 9th Infantry Regiment.

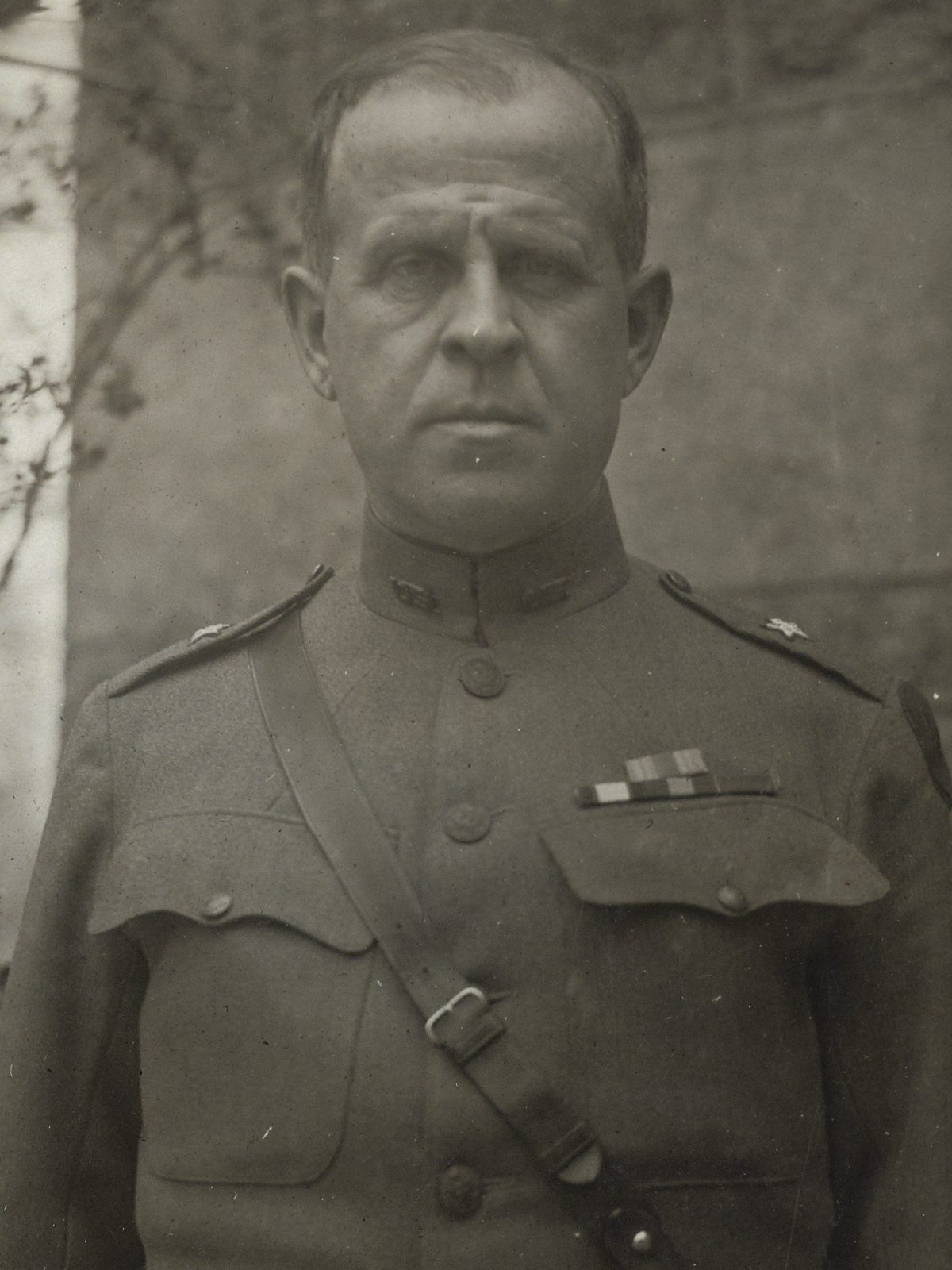
Naylor as a brigadier general shortly after the end of World War I

Naylor served as commander of Company F, 9th Infantry in the Philippines during the Philippine–American War and took part in the 1903 China Relief Expedition, the US response to the Boxer Rebellion. He was a distinguished graduate of the Infantry and Cavalry School in 1904, and graduated from the United States Army Command and General Staff College in 1904, and the United States Army War College in 1910. He became a highly regarded instructor of topics including history and military strategy, and he taught at several Army schools. Naylor authored several works which were used as texts in his courses, and were later published, including The Principles of Strategy as Illustrated by the Civil War (1917) and Principles of Strategy (1921). In 1923, he published an account of the First Battle of the Marne, The Marne Miracle. Additional published lectures and articles included: Operations on the Western Front, 1914 (Command Course No. 17, 1922); and "The Principles of War" (Infantry Journal, 1922).

== Later career ==
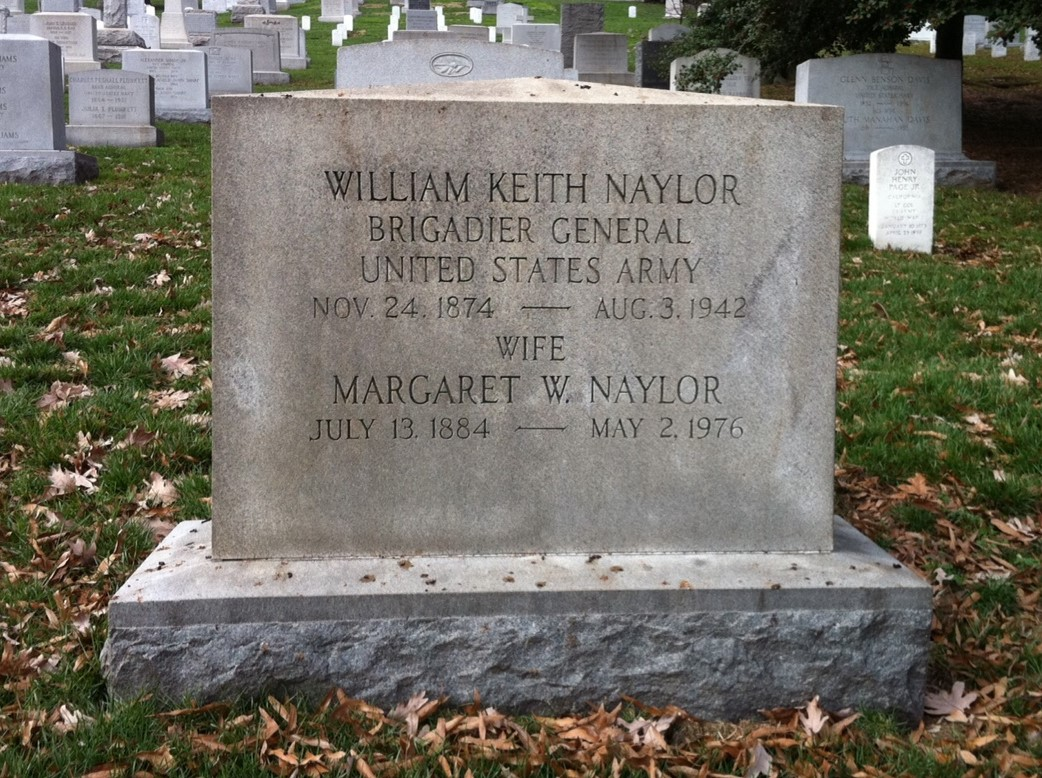
Naylor's gravestone at Arlington National Cemetery

During World War I, Naylor served as chief of staff of the 33rd Division, and later chief of staff of III Corps and IX Corps; he took part in the Second Battle of the Somme and Meuse–Argonne offensive, and received promotion to temporary brigadier general. After the war, he served as director of the General Staff School at Fort Leavenworth and chief of the army staff's War Plans Division. From 1922 to 1924, Naylor served as the army's assistant chief of staff for Intelligence (G-2).

From 1924 to 1926, Naylor commanded the 15th Infantry Regiment in China. Naylor's executive officer and second-in-command was George C. Marshall, who had acted as regimental commander prior to Naylor's arrival. Naylor was evidently unhappy with the initiative Marshall had become used to displaying while acting commander; in the final performance appraisal of Marshall that Naylor completed before ending his command tour, he rated Marshall as "above average", the second highest category. The commander of US forces in China, Brigadier General William Durward Connor, changed the ratings to the highest category, "superior". Naylor was relieved of command in January 1926, accused of alcoholism and neglect of duty; he was exonerated after performing temporary duty in the Philippines. He was then assigned to command of the 13th Infantry Regiment, first at Fort Warren, Massachusetts, and later at Fort Adams, Rhode Island, where he served until 1929.

In May 1929, Naylor was appointed chief of staff for Second Corps Area and stationed at Governors Island, New York. From May to July 1933, he was commander of the corps area's Civilian Conservation Corps organization. From July to December 1933, he was assigned as commandant of the Army Reserve Officers' Training Corps and professor of military science and tactics at the University of Illinois Urbana-Champaign. In October 1933, he was promoted to permanent brigadier general and in December he was assigned as commandant of the post at Fort Benjamin Harrison, Indiana. From October 1935 to January 1936, he commanded the Fifth Corps Area. He left the army upon reaching the mandatory retirement age of 64 in November 1938.

In retirement, Naylor was a resident of Farmington, Pennsylvania. Beginning in 1939, he served as president of the Phoenix Glass Company of Rochester, Pennsylvania. He belonged to the Delta Chi fraternity, and attained the 32nd degree of York Rite freemasonry. In addition, he belonged to Washington, DC's Army and Navy Club. Naylor died at his home in Farmington on 3 August 1942. He was buried at Arlington National Cemetery.

== Awards ==
Naylor received the Citation Star for heroism during the China Relief Expedition; when the army created the Silver Star medal in the early 1930s, Naylor's decoration was upgraded to the new award. In addition, he was a member of the Military Order of the Dragon, a fraternal order created by veterans of the China mission. For his First World War service, Naylor received the Army Distinguished Service Medal, Order of St Michael and St George (Commander) (Great Britain), Order of the Crown of Italy (Commander), and Legion of Honor (Officer) and Croix de Guerre (France).

=== Army Distinguished Service Medal citation ===
"The President of the United States of America, authorized by Act of Congress, July 9, 1918, takes pleasure in presenting the Army Distinguished Service Medal to Brigadier General William K. Naylor, United States Army, for exceptionally meritorious and distinguished services. While chief of staff of the 33d Division he exhibited conspicuous ability during operations north of Verdun, France, in September and October, 1918. he frequently visited the front-line positions under heavy enemy artillery fire, and by his personal efforts and skillful disposition was in a large measure responsible for the successes gained."

Orders: War Department, General Orders No. 59 (1919)

=== Silver Star citation ===
By direction of the President, under the provisions of the act of Congress approved July 9, 1918 (Bul. No. 43, W. D., 1918), the following-named officer was cited for gallantry in action and a silver star may be placed upon the ribbon of the China campaign medal awarded to this officer. The citation is as follows:

William K. Naylor, colonel, Infantry, then first lieutenant, 9th Infantry, United States Army. For gallantry in action, 13–14, 1900, against the city of Tientisn, China. By his coolness and heroism he inspired his men throughout the day.

Orders: War Department, General Orders No. 19 (3 May 1922)
