= Fort Hayes =

- U.S. National Register of Historic Places
- U.S. Historic district
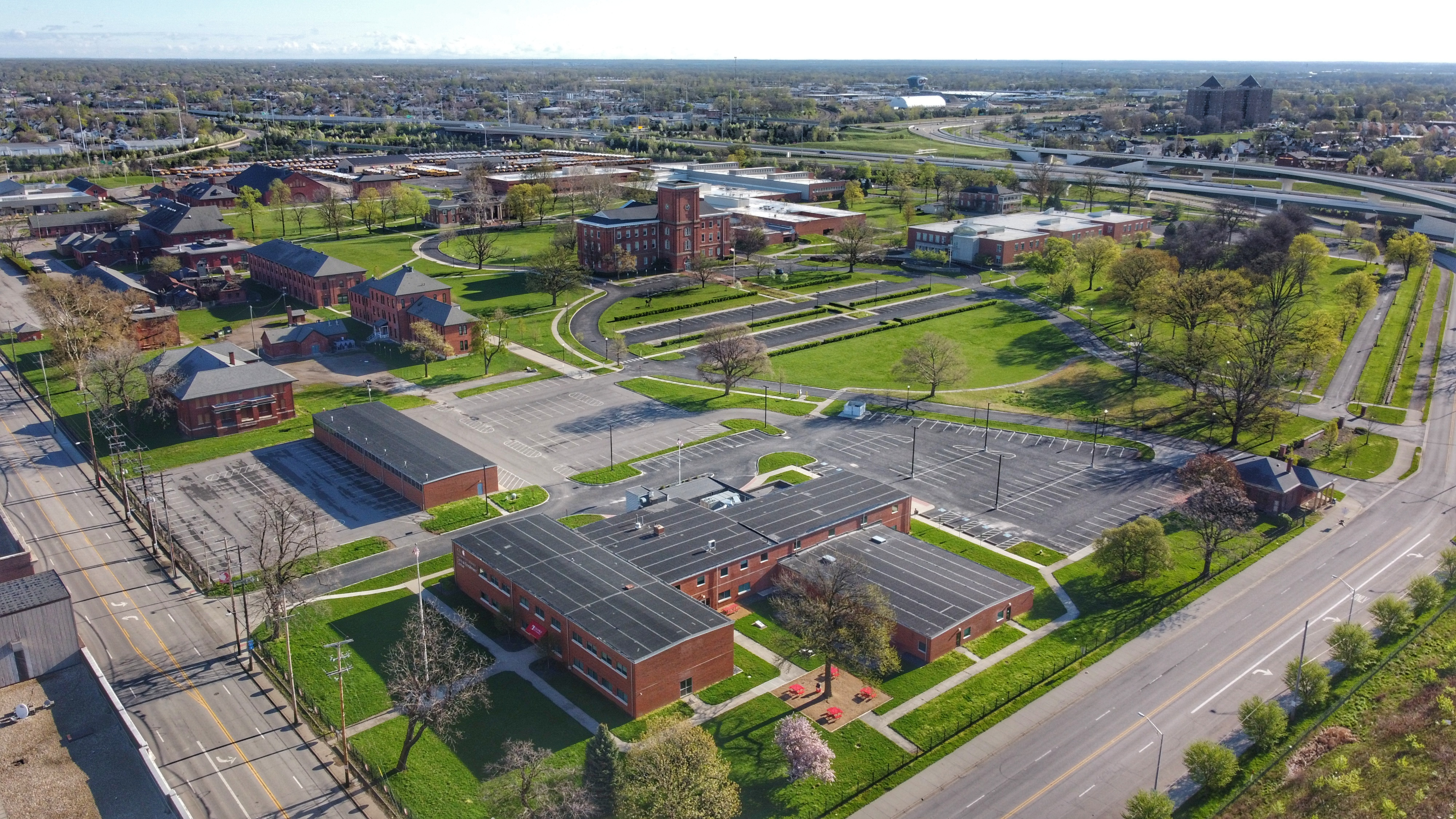
- Interactive map
- Location: Columbus, Ohio
- Coordinates: 39°58′26″N 82°59′18″W
- Built: 1863
- Architect: T.C. Bradford
- Architectural style: Renaissance
- NRHP reference No.: 70000491
- Added to NRHP: January 26, 1970

Fort Hayes was a military post in Columbus, Ohio, United States. Created by an act of the United States Congress on July 11, 1862, the site was also known as the Columbus Arsenal until 1922, when the site was renamed after former Ohio Governor and later 19th U.S. President Rutherford B. Hayes. Beginning in 2007, the property was primarily used for the Columbus School District's Fort Hayes Metropolitan Education Center and bus depot. The 391st Military Police Battalion and the 375th Criminal Investigations Division of the U.S. Army Reserve were among the last to use the facility, but the last military presence on the property was in 2009. The military built a new army reserve center in Whitehall, which ended the long-established military presence at Fort Hayes.

== History ==
The history of Fort Hayes as a military post spans from its establishment in 1863 to the departure of the remaining military presence by the end of 2009.

=== Columbus Arsenal ===
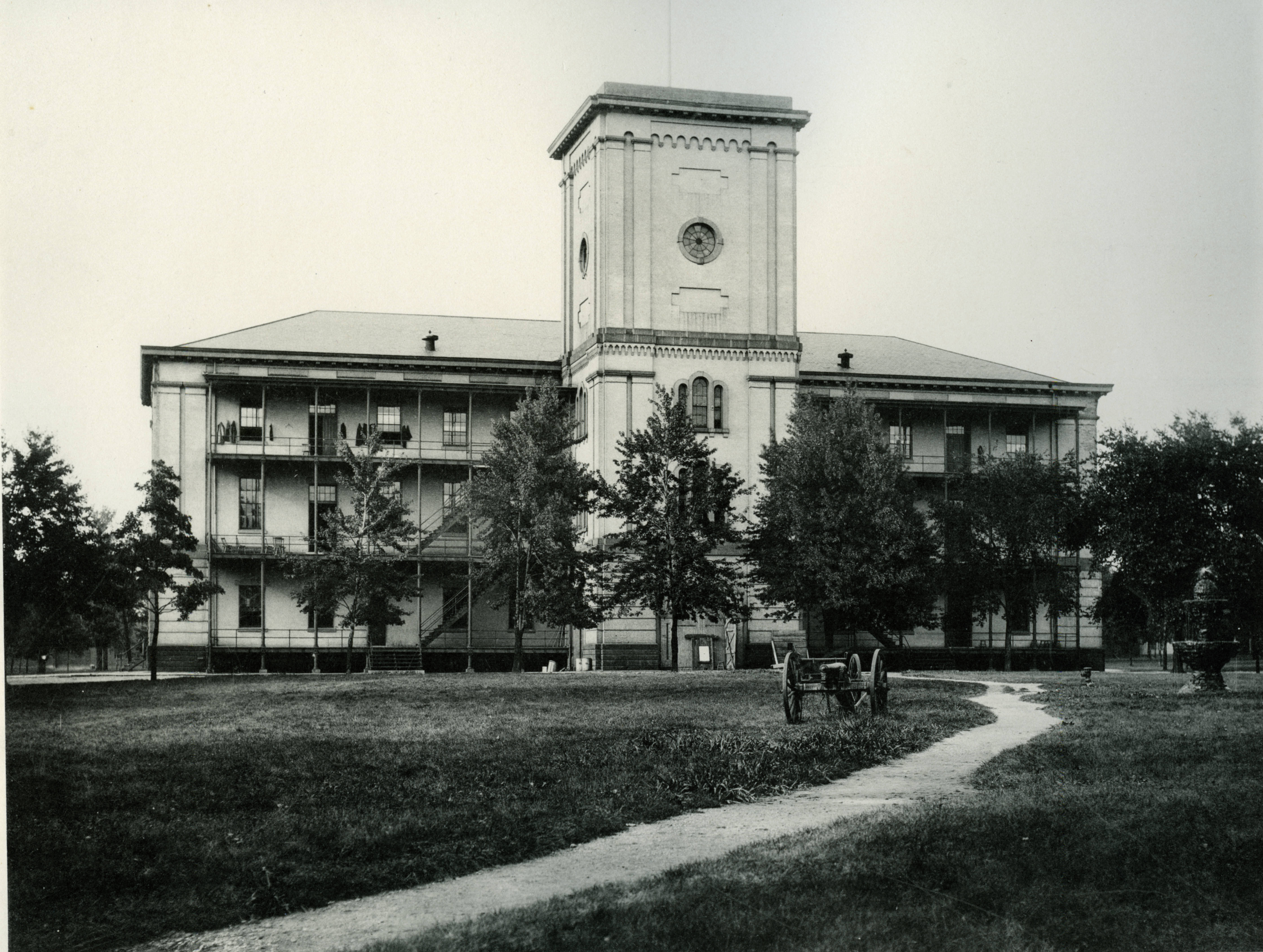
The arsenal building, c. 1897

Ordnance Corps General C.P. Buckingham selected a site nearly two years after the congressional authorization of July 1862. It was a tract of about 70 acres northeast of the city, an oak grove owned by Robert and Jannette Neil of Neil House fame. The need for an army arsenal in Central Ohio was acute soon after the American Civil War broke out. Arms and tools for the state's first regiments were crammed into the state arsenal, but that structure was deemed unsafe and a fire hazard. The army needed a modern arsenal for the receipt and issuance of arms and equipment and the manufacture and storage of ammunition.

Captain J. W. Todd, of the United States Army Ordnance Corps, was the first commander of the Columbus Arsenal, as the post was first known. High command was nothing more than a field of oak stumps and some temporary shacks. Captain Todd also prepared the first arsenal master plan:

- 1 two-story brick workshop, 180′ X 60′: $27,758
- 4 storehouses, 200′ x 50′: $98,884
- Barracks and EM quarters: $7,500
- 1 blacksmith shop: $2,000
- 1 stable and laboratory: $5,000
- 1 office building, brick, one-story: $2,400
- 1 officer's quarters, brick, two-story: $11,250
- 1 guardhouse and brick wall, 10′ high: $44,283
- Railroad switch: $5,000
- Landscaping: $10,000
- Inflation: $10,000

Total Budget: $224,075

The Todd plan was $10,000 in excess of what Congress was to be asked to appropriate. Captain Todd did not remain at this assignment long enough to see his plan accepted for implementation. He was replaced by the "Father" of Fort Hayes, Captain T. C. Bradford, on January 16, 1864. Bradford arrived to build the new post from scratch, where he served until 1867, being promoted to Major, then Colonel before 1866. He resumed command again for six months in 1869, then departed for San Antonio.

Bradford's first task was to secure the completion of the rail spur and procure carts, horses, tools, hoisting machines and materials with which to build the main building and other buildings. By April 1864, the excavation was dug, the tracks' grading completed, and temporary carpenter's shop built, and two wells dug and equipped with pumps to supply water for the needs of men, animals, and construction.

Bradford called his magnum opus the "Store House", the first of many names which would be applied to the post's principal facility. Plans for the building had been drawn in Washington by the Ordnance Corps. Bradford, however, made many on-site changes to the plans as construction proceeded. Building materials in that time were difficult and expensive to obtain. For foundation material, Bradford went to Newark, Ohio, for sandstone, the first cargo brought in on the new rail spur during the summer of 1864. Brick was fired in Columbus by brickmakers who Bradford continually had to watch because of inferior workmanship. Flooring and other timber he obtained from southern Ohio (There are 50,000 board feet of ash flooring in the arsenal which cost $20.00 to $25.00 per thousand feet). Copper and cast iron cornices he had manufactured in Cincinnati.

The officers' quarters and magazine were ordered built on June 3, 1864, as designed by master building Joseph O. Sawyer. The foundation for the magazine, with a capacity of 2,500 barrels of powder, was built in September, ready for brickwork, and all lumber for this building was on the grounds.

As the main building rose, Bradford devoted much attention to the tower. The original purpose of this dominant feature was to accommodate stone steps to each floor. At Bradford's urging, the plans were altered to incorporate wooden steps and hoisting apparatus, and an elevator to move supplies more easily among the floors. As finally constructed, the tower was a duplicate of the one attached to the Indianapolis arsenal.

Long before the main arsenal building was completed in 1865, the post was receiving, storing, and issuing arms and accoutrements in large amounts. On May 6, 1864, 10,000 sets of equipage and five thousand Enfield rifles to arm "three-months" of enlistees were being issued, and the post had enough arms stored in the temporary warehouse to arm and equip 30,000 men. From its holding that month alone, the Columbus Arsenal shipped to other arsenals two million rounds of elongated ball cartridges, 400 percussion artillery shells, and 600 shells for 3-inch guns.

The first building at Fort Hayes was completed in 1864 and is known as Building #62. Arms and equipment of the "100-day" men being mustered out in Ohio were being received by the arsenal in August 1864, but not until late that year were the commodious facilities of the main building in use.

Ironically, the first man killed on the post was a civilian, Nicholas Kaetzel, who, on April 5, 1865, was blown up while firing a salute to honor the capture of Richmond, VA.(Source: United States Senate Record, May 17, 1866)

The main business of the arsenal during the last months of the war was the trans-shipment of ammunition (paper and metal cartridges), the receipt and issuance of Springfield rifles, and sets of equipage for 10 regiments to be formed at Camp Chase in Columbus.

Civilians, under Colonel Bradford, conducted much of the business of the arsenal until October 25, 1865, when the first permanently assigned detachment of enlisted men were stationed here. Twenty-five men were authorized to be enlisted locally and were ordered to be one sergeant, four corporals, five privates first class, and twelve privates second class. These new recruits of the regular army were quickly trained by Bradford to receive the large amount of arms and equipment being turned in by Ohio regiments rapidly being deactivated. Civilian employees were retained to repair, in the main building, the Springfield and Enfield rifle muskets turned in by either cannibalizing or by adding new parts shipped in from the Springfield Armory. The rule was, if a piece could be made serviceable for fifty cents or less, to do so; if not, utilize only the unworn parts.

On November 10, 1865, with the magazine at the post filled to capacity, the main building's basement was authorized for storage of ammunition, and the first live rounds were placed in the building. Four million cartridges were placed in the basement that winter, and 10,000 new Spencer carbines were stored in upper floors. So crowded was the building late in November that the first public auction of military stores was authorized and held. By early 1866, artillery was stored in large numbers of pieces, transferred from the Newport, Kentucky arsenal under Colonel Bradford's personal supervision. The appearance of the Civil War-era Columbus arsenal was ragged and cluttered until Spring of 1866, when the first shade and ornamental trees and shrubs were planted at a cost of $150. With the coming of peace, the post came to assume a more ordered, regulated posture.

The War Department transferred the Columbus arsenal on September 24, 1875 to the general Recruiting Service for depot purposes, where it came to be known as Columbus Barracks. At that time, the value of site and building was reckoned at nearly $500,000.

=== Columbus Barracks and Fort Hayes ===
In 1875, the War Department repurposed the facility for use as a recruiting intake and training facility. It became known as the Columbus Barracks and later the Columbus Arsenal. In 1922, the property was renamed Fort Hayes, in honor of Rutherford B. Hayes.

Between 1875 and 1890, Columbus Barracks was used to instruct recruits, specifically music boys, select recruits, disposable recruits, unexamined recruits, and colored recruits. Four companies of cadre were organized in February 1881. Recruits were given specialized instruction of from one to four months' duration. In 1894, the command general of the Department of the East took charge of Columbus. Barracks and garrisoned it with the 17th Infantry Regiment. The post remained as a recruiting rendezvous manned by two skeleton companies for the next two years when it entered, during the Spanish–American War, a period of building and enlarged occupancy for recruitment and training. The arsenal building, now called the Main Building, was altered inside to accommodate 500 recruits. New barracks, officers' houses, and a host of other buildings were erected (among them the reception center, mess building, drill hall, new guardhouse and bandstand). A post newspaper, The Army Herald, was started in 1895 and continued until 1896. A file is in the library of the Ohio Historical Society.

In 1900, the post was enlarged by nearly 8 acres, and five years later became officially the Columbus Recruiting Depot of two infantry companies and six recruiting companies. A band was assigned the post in 1906 when concerns became a regular public attraction.

Electricity came to the depot in 1908, and with it a new building program of a hospital, PX, a gym, new officers' quarters, noncommissioned officers' quarters, a bakery, a laundry, a warehouse and several barracks.

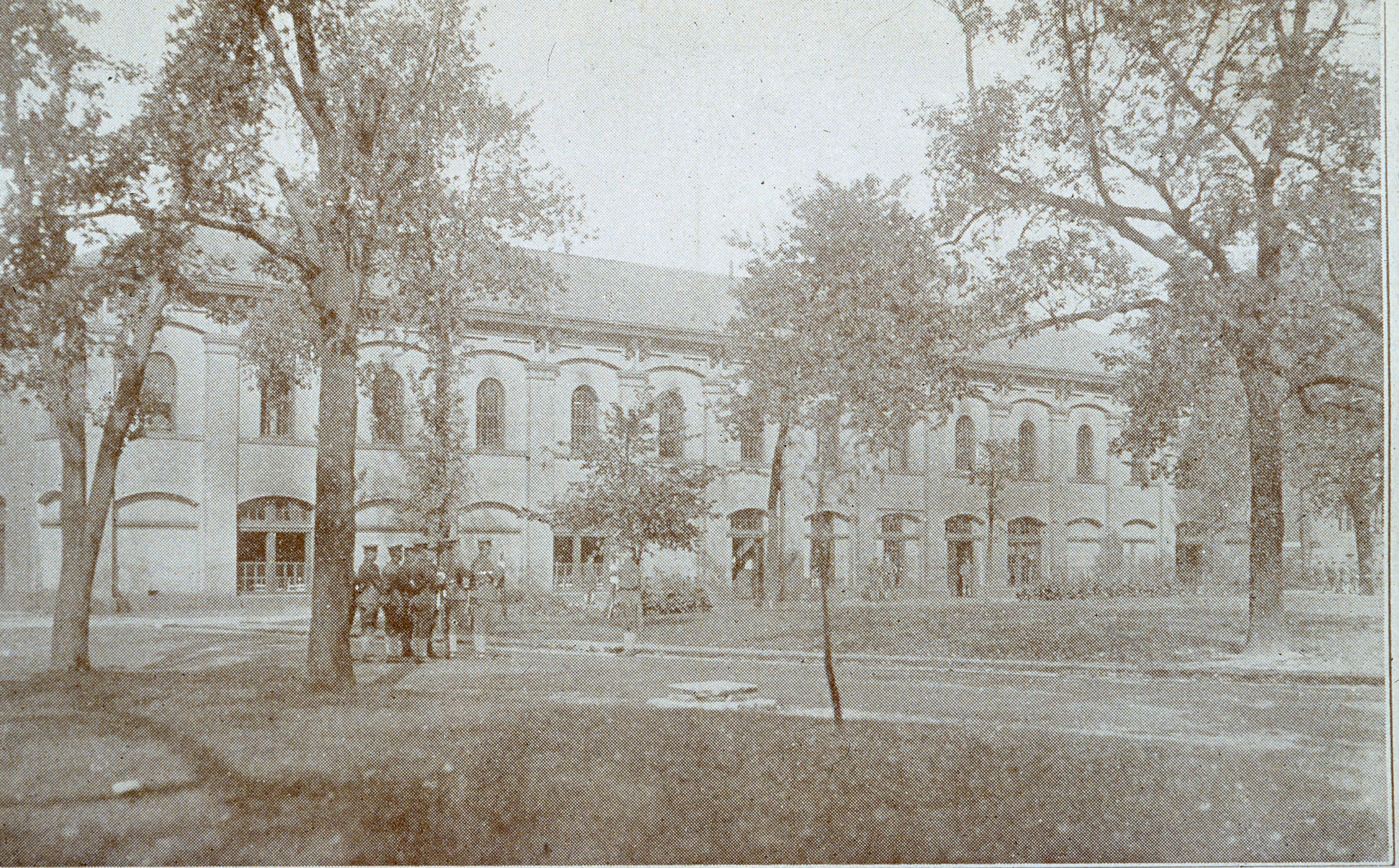
Soldiers stand at attention in front of the 10th company headquarters at the Fort Hayes barracks (1918-1923)

The razing, in 1910, of the old headquarters building uncovered the site of one of Colonel Bradford's original wells. With the advent of World War I and the signing by President Wilson on May 18, 1917, of the Selective Military Conscription Act, old Columbus barracks became a beehive of activity. Barns and stables became garages and repair shops as the Army increased numbers of Regular Army recruits who passed through the post beginning in 1917. After the war, in 1922, the post became headquarters of the Fifth Corps Area comprising the areas of Ohio, West Virginia, Indiana and Kentucky. Major General George A. Reed was the commander when, in June, the corps came to Columbus. In 1922, the name of the post was changed to Fort Hayes in honor of Rutherford B. Hayes, an Ohio Governor and later President of the United States. In 1933, the present parade grounds were constructed and the Civilian Conservation Corps constructed seven new frame buildings

During the early years of World War II, Fort Hayes continued as it had in the past as a reception center when it had stationed on its grounds 2,000 officers and men. But on March 1, 1944, this function was discontinued. The Ohio National Guard was granted use of the post on December 17, 1946. Used by both the Army Reserve and the Guard of Engineers, it continued in use by the State and Federal governments for both military and civilian functions.

=== Fort Hayes Metropolitan Education Center ===
Fort Hayes Metropolitan Education Center (FHMEC), an urban public high school, located at the edge of downtown Columbus, has as its mission " …to create expectations of excellence within students through challenging and collaborative learning, blending the arts, academics and career programs."

The Fort Hayes Career Center was established in 1976 on the site of a part of the military base. Fort Hayes was used as a training and induction center during the Civil War through the Vietnam War, the Federal Government abandoned the fifty acres on which the Fort Hayes Career Center (now the Fort Hayes Metropolitan Education Center) is located. Through the leadership of Jack Gibbs and the efforts of two local congressmen, the Columbus Public Schools was able to purchase these fifty acres for one dollar ($1.00). The career center was composed of four buildings–the Business Building, the Health Building, the Visual Arts Center (Shot Tower—though shot was never made here), and the Battelle Math/Science Building. In the fall of 1988, the Fort Hayes campus became the site for three unique educational programs: a career center program, The Battelle Youth Science Program, and an arts and academic high school. The Fort Hayes Career Center component offers vocational courses in health/medical services, data processing, commercial art and photography, and the fine and performing arts. The Battelle Youth Science Program provided advanced laboratory and academic courses in math and science. The Fort Hayes Arts and Academic High School, the newest component, focuses on excellence in performance–performance in a rigorous college preparatory program and a rich immersion in the art areas of music, dance, theater, and visual arts.

During the 1988–89 school year, the Fort Hayes Arts and Academic High School was created, joining Columbus Public Schools' excellently rated arts, business, childcare, and health vocational programs. Ninth and tenth graders (about 223 of them) arrived to begin the work of starting a new high school, along with 23 new staff members. An additional grade level was added each year, and the first senior class graduated in June 1991. Twice in the past ten years, the school has been recognized by Redbook magazine as an outstanding school in the country, and in the Spring of 1995, by Ohio's Best Schools as an exemplary "Break the Mold School." In 1997, the school was recognized by Business Week magazine as one of ten schools in the nation for Instructional Innovation with an Arts-Driven Curriculum. The International Network for Performing and Visual Arts Schools selected Fort Hayes as the Outstanding School for the 1997–98 school year.

FHMEC reflects the cultural, economic, religious and ethnic diversity of the urban community it serves: 51 percent African-American; 47 percent Caucasian; nearly 4 percent Asian-American; and less than 1 percent Hispanic students. Sixty-three percent of the students are female. Students bring a variety of religious beliefs: Christian, Jewish, Muslim, Buddhist, Hindu, and Taoist. Approximately 30 percent of the students reside in low-income households. With some exceptions, the remaining 70 percent reside in middle-income households. Over 1,100 students, 80-plus faculty, and five administrators are located on the total campus in the course of a school day.
