= 310th Regiment =

310th Regiment may refer to:

- 310th Armored Cavalry Regiment, United States
- 310th Cavalry Regiment, United States
- 310th Infantry Regiment, United States
- 310th (Manchester) Heavy Anti-Aircraft Regiment, Royal Artillery

== See also ==
- 310th (disambiguation)
