= 3100 series =

3100 series or 3100 class train may refer to:

== Japanese train types ==
- Hakone Tozan 3100 series, an electric multiple unit train
- Hankyu 3100 series, an electric multiple unit train
- Keisei 3100 series, an electric multiple unit train
- Meitetsu 3100 series, an electric multiple unit train included
- Odakyu 3100 series NSE, an electric multiple unit train

== Other ==
- CP Class 3100
- GWR 3100 Class
- MRTC 3100 class, a light rail vehicle
- Queensland Railways 3100/3200 class

== See also ==
- 3100 (disambiguation)
