= 311th Regiment =

311th Regiment may refer to:

- 311th Armored Cavalry Regiment, United States
- 311th Cavalry Regiment, United States
- 311th (City of Bristol) Heavy Anti-Aircraft Regiment, Royal Artillery
