= MMMC =

MMMC may refer to:

- 3100 (disambiguation) in Roman numerals
- Myanmar Mercatile Marine College, a former name of Yangon Institute of Marine Technology
- Metal, Mining, Maritime and Construction Union, an affiliate of the Namibia National Labour Organisation
- Multani Mal Modi College
- MultiMedia Magazine Creator, see Miggybyte
