= 3100 class =

3100 class may refer to:

- 3100 class railcar, in Adelaide, South Australia
- GWR 3100 Class, 2-6-2T steam locomotives
- MRTC 3100 class, Manila light rail vehicles
- Queensland Railways 3100/3200 class, electric locomotives
