= 312th Regiment =

312th Regiment may refer to:

- 312th Cavalry Regiment, United States
- 312th (Gloucestershire) Heavy Anti-Aircraft Regiment, Royal Artillery
- 312th (Wessex) Medium Regiment, Royal Artillery
