= 63rd Cavalry Division (United States) =

63rd Cavalry Division Shoulder Sleeve Insignia
- Active: 15 October 1921–30 January 1942
- Country: United States of America
- Branch: United States Army
- Type: Cavalry
- Size: Division
- Part of: United States Army Reserve

The U.S. Army's 63rd Cavalry Division of the Organized Reserve was created from the perceived need for additional cavalry units in the interwar period. It was numbered in succession of the Regular Army Divisions, which were not all active at its creation.

The 63rd Cavalry Division's units were located in the Southern and Southwestern United States; the division was composed of personnel from Texas, Oklahoma, Colorado, Arizona, Alabama, Georgia, Louisiana, Tennessee, and North Carolina.

== History ==
The 63rd Cavalry Division was constituted in the Organized Reserve on 15 October 1921, allotted to the Fourth and Eighth Corps Areas, and assigned to the Fifth Army. The division headquarters was initiated on 7 July 1922 at Poland and Dauphine Streets in New Orleans, Louisiana, by Colonel James H. Hornbeck. The division headquarters was moved to Fort Oglethorpe, Georgia, on 10 October 1923 because that post provided a more central location from which to control the division's scattered units. Originally, Camp Beauregard, Louisiana, had been designated as the mobilization station for the division headquarters, but it was changed to Fort Oglethorpe when the headquarters moved there. The division headquarters was relocated once again on 8 July 1927 when it was moved to the Pound Building in Chattanooga, Tennessee, where it remained until the beginning of World War II.

Except for the 156th Cavalry Brigade, which was to mobilize at Fort Clark, Texas, and the 403rd Engineer Squadron and division quartermaster train, which were to form at Camp Beauregard, the division's remaining units were to mobilize at Fort Oglethorpe. The division tables of organization remained unchanged from its formation until 1 July 1929, when the Machine Gun Squadrons were eliminated and absorbed into other units. Other changes to the division at that time were the addition of the 463rd Armored Car Squadron, 463rd Tank Company (Light), and the expansion of the 463rd Field Artillery Battalion into a regiment (and concurrent redesignation as the 863rd). Additionally, when the field armies were activated and army areas reallocated in 1933, the division was relieved from the Fifth Army and assigned to the Third Army. The division's Inactive Training Period usually ran September to May. Many of the units held their training meetings at National Guard armories or trained with ROTC units in the city where the majority of their officers were located. Units in the Chattanooga and Atlanta areas were fortunate in that they participated in a marksmanship training program at the Catoosa Training Area and Range, near the Chickamauga National Battlefield.

Division units held their summer training camps at a wide variety of posts throughout the South and were able to establish consistent training partnerships with the Regular Army units at those locations. The 6th Cavalry at Fort Oglethorpe provided support to the units of the 155th Cavalry Brigade in terms of horses, equipment, and training expertise. The 156th Cavalry Brigade and 311th Cavalry trained with the 1st Cavalry Brigade and the 5th Cavalry, respectively, at Fort Clark, while the 312th Cavalry and 156th Machine Gun Squadron trained at Fort Bliss and were supported with men and horses from the 7th Cavalry and the 2nd Machine Gun Squadron. As an alternate form of training, the cavalry regiments of the 155th Cavalry Brigade occasionally conducted the training of the cavalry elements of the Citizens' Military Training Camps (CMTC) at Fort Oglethorpe. In July 1935, virtually the entire division, save the 156th Cavalry Brigade, trained the various branches of the CMTC at Fort Oglethorpe. Under the guiding eyes of the men of the 6th Cavalry and the Regulars assigned to the division, the CMTC provided one of the few opportunities the 63rd Cavalry Division had to operate its various echelons of headquarters simultaneously.

The 1930s saw the level of training in the division accelerate and become more varied as experience levels increased in the staff officers of the headquarters, as well as in the officers of the units. For example, in May 1936, the brigade and regimental staffs of the 156th Cavalry Brigade participated in the Third Army command post exercise (CPX) at Fort Bliss. The training objective of the CPX was to begin the process of preparing staffs of the Regular Army, National Guard, and Organized Reserve units for the army-level maneuvers scheduled for the summer of 1938. In the same vein, the division and brigade staffs participated in a 2-week, division-level CPX held at the Chickamauga Battlefield in May 1937. Due to the lack of horses, equipment, and enlisted men, the 63rd Cavalry Division did not participate in the 1938 Third Army maneuver as an organized division. Instead, the members of the division reinforced Regular or Guard units to bring them up to wartime strength in officers or by acting as umpires. In general, the eastern elements of the division reinforced the 55th Cavalry Brigade, 127th Engineer Squadron, and the 141st Field Artillery of the 23rd Cavalry Division, all of which participated in the Fourth Corps Area portion of the maneuvers held in the De Soto National Forest in Mississippi. Concurrently, the 156th Cavalry Brigade reinforced the Texas National Guard's 56th Cavalry Brigade and the 1st Cavalry Brigade of the 1st Cavalry Division, which participated in the maneuver at Camp Bullis, Texas, as part of the Eighth Corps Area concentration. In all, over 300 officers from the division participated in the Third Army maneuver that year.

The next major event in the life of the division was the 1940 Third Army maneuver held near the Kisatchie National Forest in central Louisiana in August 1940. Once again, the officers of the 63rd reinforced the 1st and 23rd Cavalry Divisions, but also provided a substantial number of officers to the 31st Division as well. The 1940 maneuver in central Louisiana was the division's last major training event. Shortly thereafter, most of the division's assigned personnel were called to active duty during the build-up of the US Army in 1940–41. The 63rd Cavalry Division headquarters was disbanded on 30 January 1942.

=== Organization, 1940 ===
- Headquarters
- Headquarters, Special Troops
  - Headquarters Troop
  - 63rd Signal Troop
  - 583rd Ordnance Company (Medium)
  - 463rd Tank Company (Light)
- 155th Cavalry Brigade
  - 309th Cavalry Regiment
  - 310th Cavalry Regiment
- 156th Cavalry Brigade
  - 311th Cavalry Regiment
  - 312th Cavalry Regiment
- 463rd Reconnaissance Squadron
- 863rd Field Artillery Regiment
- 403rd Engineer Squadron
- 363rd Medical Squadron
- 463rd Quartermaster Squadron

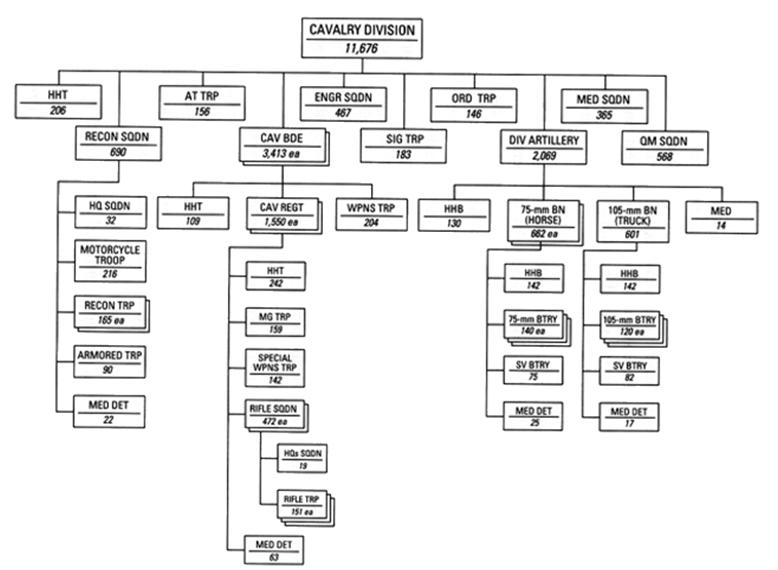
Standard organization chart for a Cavalry Division in November 1940

== See also ==
- United States Army branch insignia
- List of armored and cavalry regiments of the United States Army
