= Walter Cowen Short =

U.S. Army brigadier general (1870–1952)

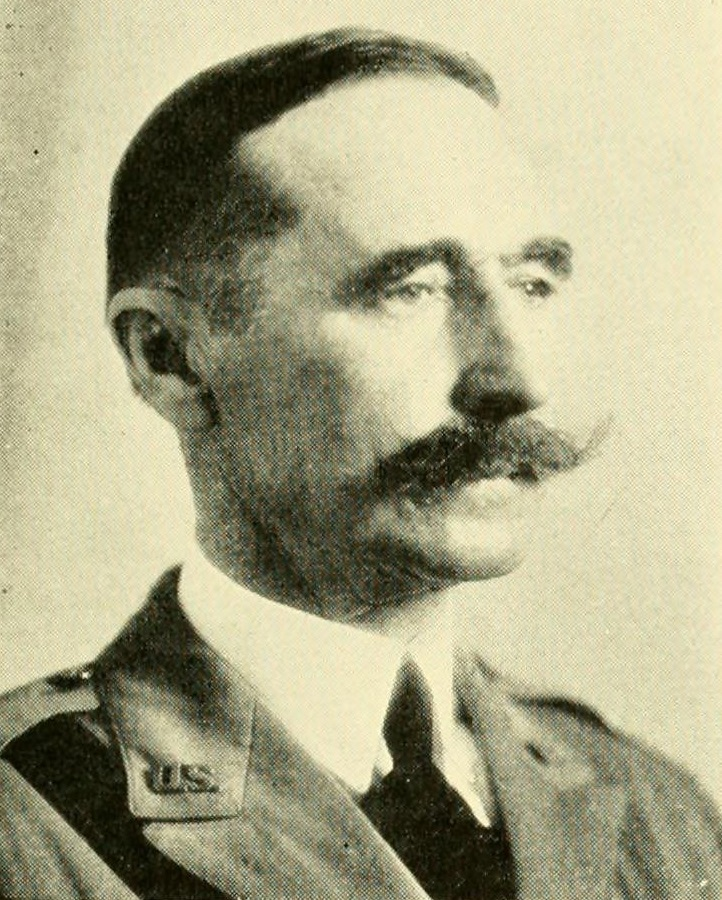
- From 1920's History of the Ohio State University
- Born: April 2, 1870; Columbus, Ohio
- Died: March 5, 1952 (aged 81); San Diego, California
- Burial place: Fort Rosecrans National Cemetery
- Spouse: Hortense DuBois Wilson (m. 1901–1934, his death)
- Children: 1
- Relatives: Sidney Howe Short (brother); John Thomas Short(brother); Verne D. Mudge (son-in-law)
- Military career
- Allegiance: United States
- Branch: United States Army
- Service years: 1891–1934
- Rank: Brigadier General
- Service number: 0-399
- Unit: U.S. Cavalry Branch
- Commands: Troop L, 6th Cavalry Regiment; Troop A, 6th Cavalry Regiment; Bayamo, Cuba; Fort Yosemite, California; 337th Infantry Regiment; 312th Cavalry Regiment; 315th Cavalry Regiment; 71st Artillery Regiment; 72nd Artillery Regiment; 32nd Infantry Brigade, 16th Division; 16th Cavalry Regiment; 7th Cavalry Regiment; 2nd Cavalry Brigade; Fort Bliss, Texas; 1st Cavalry Division
- Conflicts: Garza Revolution; Spanish–American War; United States Military Government in Cuba; Philippine–American War; Pancho Villa Expedition; World War I
- Awards: Silver Star; Purple Heart

Walter C. Short (April 2, 1870 – March 5, 1952) was a career officer in the United States Army. A veteran of the Spanish–American War, Pancho Villa Expedition, and World War I, he attained the rank of brigadier general. Short was most notable for the organization and training of several units during the first World War, and his command of the 1st Cavalry Division between World War I and World War II.

== Early life ==
Walter Cowen Short (Note: His middle name sometimes appears in records and newspaper articles as "Cowan".) was born in Columbus, Ohio on April 2, 1870, a son of John Short and Elizabeth L. (Cowen) Short. He was raised and educated in Columbus, and attended Marietta College from 1887 to 1888. He was a student in the preparatory department at Ohio State University from 1888 to 1889. Short attended Michigan Military Academy from 1889 to 1890. After graduating, he remained on the academy's faculty as professor of grammar and arithmetic.

== Start of career ==
While attending Marietta College, Short joined the Ohio National Guard's 3rd Infantry Battalion. He was soon commissioned as a captain, and he remained with the battalion for two years. In 1889, he was commissioned as a colonel on the staff of Governor Joseph B. Foraker, and his duties included arranging for the participation of Ohio National Guard troops in the inauguration of Benjamin Harrison as president.

At Michigan Military Academy's 1891 graduation ceremony, U.S. Army officers in attendance including Colonel Edward Miles Heyl commended the drill and ceremony of cadets under Short's command and made note of Short's bearing and appearance. When a lieutenant's vacancy occurred in the 6th Cavalry Regiment shortly after the graduation, Heyl recommended Short for the appointment despite the fact that he was not among the 1,800 individuals who had applied. He did not pass the week-long qualifying examination on the first attempt. He passed on the second, and received his commission as a second lieutenant of Cavalry on October 7, 1891.

Short reported for duty with the 3rd Cavalry at Fort Sam Houston, Texas. Soon after he arrived, the Garza Revolution began when Catarino Garza launched an attack on Mexico from Texas in an effort to topple the government of Porfirio Díaz. Short was ordered to Fort Ringgold with two cavalry troops under the command of a captain. He was soon assigned to command of the troops, and led them until hostilities died down when Garza went into hiding to avoid capture by U.S. soldiers. During this conflict, the units under Short's command participated in a number of engagements along the Texas-Mexico border and took several prisoners.

After leaving Texas, Short joined the 6th Cavalry at Fort Niobrara, Nebraska, and assumed command of Troop L (the regiment's American Indian scouts). During the 1894 Pullman Strike, the 6th Cavalry was on duty in Chicago, and Short served on the regimental staff. After the strike, the 6th Cavalry was assigned to Fort Myer, Virginia and Short continued to serve on its staff.

== Spanish–American War ==
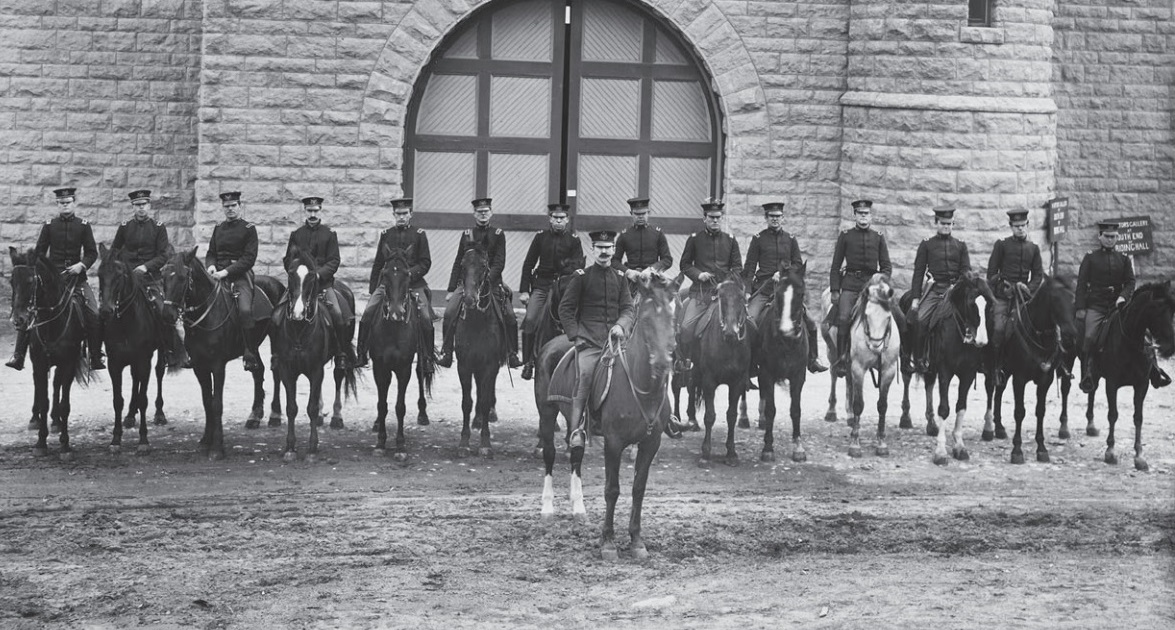
Short and Cavalry School staff, 1905

At the start of the Spanish–American War in 1898, Short was assigned command of the 6th Cavalry's Troop A. While the regiment was in Tampa, Florida awaiting transportation to Cuba, Short was appointed an assistant adjutant general of United States Volunteers with the temporary rank of major. His nomination was confirmed by the United States Senate, but Short declined in order to serve at the front with his regiment.

After arriving in Cuba, Short was promoted to temporary captain. The 6th Cavalry led the charge at the July 1, 1898 Battle of San Juan Hill, with most troopers marching because they had been required to abandon their horses due to the difficult terrain. Short was mounted in order to better direct his troops, and his horse was shot during the fighting. He continued to lead on foot, and was among the first soldiers to reach the top of the hill. During the battle, Short was shot three times, with one round entering his side and passing out near the spine, one causing a flesh wound to one of his arms, and one wounding his wrist. Despite his wounds, Short remained on his feet until clearing the Spanish army's breastworks. His comrades, including John J. Pershing, carried him from the battlefield, convinced he would not recover. A photo in The Illustrated London News of August 20, 1898 depicted the scene of Short being carried, and he gained a measure of fame as a result.

Short was evacuated to a military hospital in Key West, Florida. After convalescing for ten days, he was well enough to sneak away from the hospital and rejoin the 6th Cavalry in Cuba. He received a brevet promotion to major in recognition of his heroism and remained in Cuba until the end of the war.

== Post-war ==
After leaving Cuba, Short served with the 10th Cavalry regiment at Fort Riley, Kansas and Fort Sam Houston, Texas. He was then ordered back to Cuba as the officer in charge of a 100-man detail from the 10th Cavalry. Short and his men took part in the United States Military Government in Cuba, and Short was appointed de facto governor of the city of Bayamo and surrounding towns. Under his leadership, 10th Cavalry soldiers drove out or captured gangs of robbers who had long dominated the area, and killed 37. They improved sanitation in Bayamo, established several new schools, installed telegraph lines, and improved the roads between the city and Cuba's coastline.

After his service in Cuba, Short was assigned to Vancouver Barracks, Washington as a major in the 35th United States Volunteer Infantry. The regiment was soon ordered to the Philippines, where Short served during the Philippine–American War. He was mustered out of the volunteer service in 1901 and promoted to captain as a member of the 13th Cavalry at Fort Keogh, Montana.

In 1902, the Army established the Cavalry School at Fort Riley, and Short was appointed its first senior instructor. He remained on the faculty until 1907, when he was selected for attendance at the Saumur Cavalry School in France. After completing the course as a student, which enabled him to observe French methods of instruction, Short returned to Fort Riley as the Cavalry School's assistant commandant, where he remained until 1911.

Short was assigned to the 1st Cavalry Regiment in 1911. In addition to performing duty with his regiment at the Presidio of San Francisco, Short was also assigned as commander of Fort Yosemite and the troops assigned to oversee the operations of Yosemite National Park. In 1913, Short was assigned to Schofield Barracks, Hawaii as a member of the 4th Cavalry Regiment. In 1915 he was promoted to major and assigned to the 16th Cavalry at Fort Ringgold, Texas. During this assignment, Short performed duty on the Texas-Mexico Border during the Pancho Villa Expedition.

== World War I ==
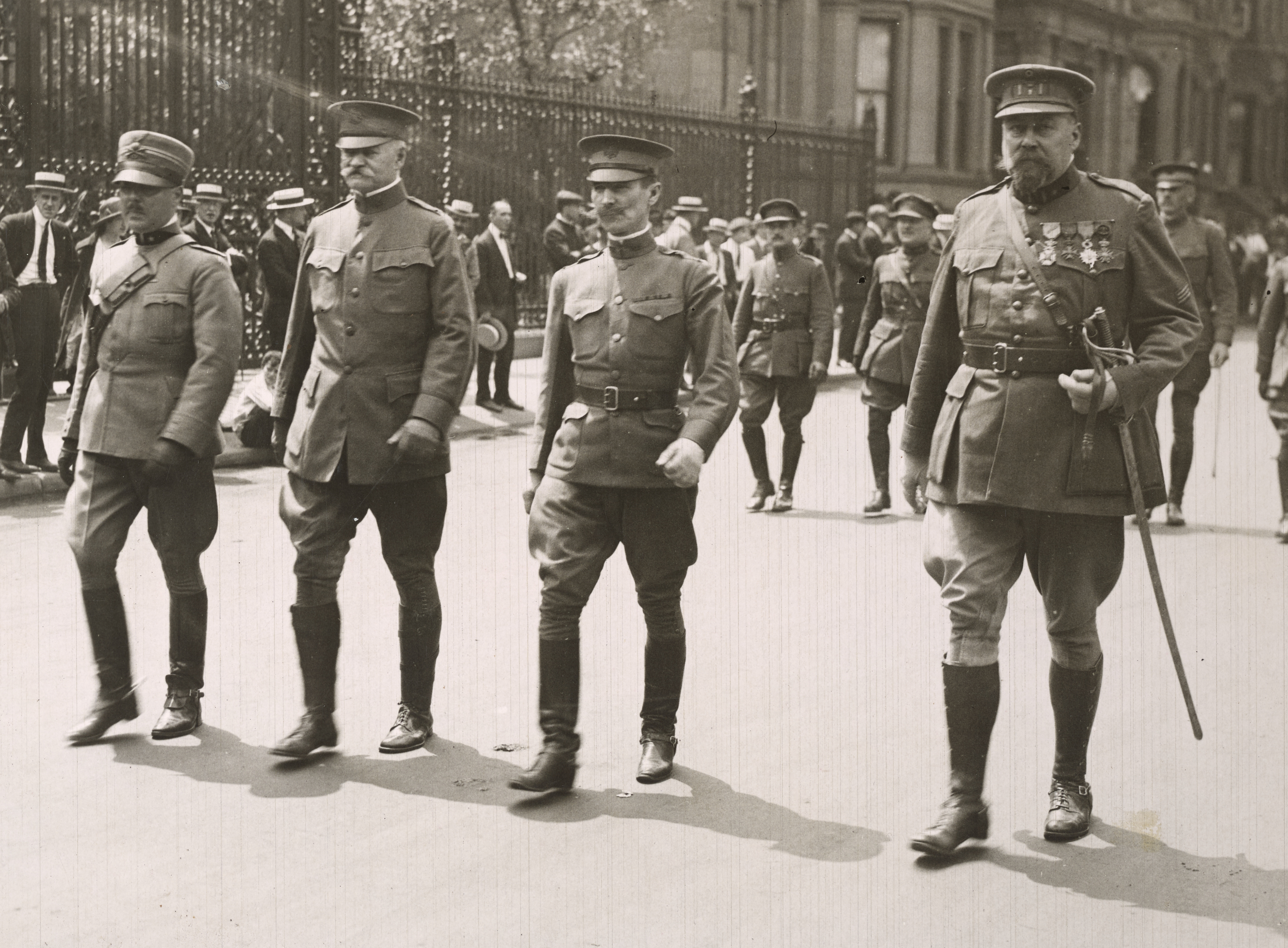
Short (second from right) with representatives of the Belgian military, June 1918)

In May 1917, a month after the American entry into World War I, Short was promoted to lieutenant colonel. In August 1917, he was promoted to temporary colonel and assigned command of the 337th Infantry Regiment during its initial organization and training. He subsequently commanded the 312th and 315th Cavalry Regiments, which he organized and trained. When the Army determined that Cavalry units were not needed on the front lines, Short was responsible for converting these regiments to Field Artillery, and they went to France as the 71st and 72nd Artillery Regiments.

From September to October 1918, Short commanded the 8th Infantry Regiment at Camp Fremont, California. He was promoted to temporary brigadier general in October 1918 and assigned to command the 32nd Brigade, 16th Division at Camp Kearny, California. Due to the Armistice with Germany on November 11, 1918, the war ended before the 16th Division departed for France, and Short reverted to his permanent rank of lieutenant colonel in 1919.

== Post-World War I ==
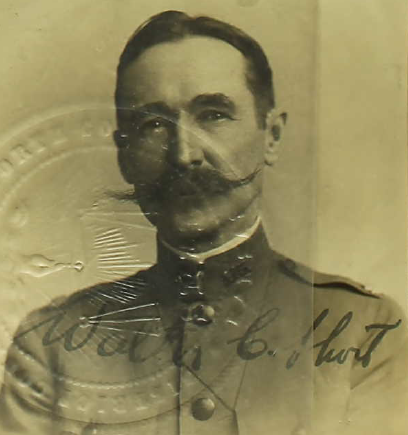
Short's 1920 passport photo

After World War I, Short served in Belgium as manager of the U.S. equestrian team at the 1920 Summer Olympics. He then attended the United States Army Command and General Staff College at Fort Leavenworth. After graduation, he was promoted to colonel and assigned to command the 16th Cavalry at Fort Sam Houston, Texas. In 1921, he was transferred to command of the 7th Cavalry. In October 1923, Short was detailed to the Inspector General's department, and he served for two years in San Francisco and two in Honolulu.

In October 1927, Short was promoted to brigadier general and assigned to the Advanced Air Corps School at Fort Langley, Virginia. He subsequently served at the Infantry School at Fort Benning, Georgia and the Cavalry School at Fort Riley. In 1928, he took command of the 2nd Cavalry Brigade at Fort Bliss, Texas. Also in 1928, Short was manager of the U.S. equestrian team that took part in the Summer Olympics, which were held in Amsterdam. He commanded the 1st Cavalry Division from 1930 to 1932. He was commander of Fort Bliss in 1933 and commanded the 1st Cavalry Division again in 1934. Short retired in April 1934.

== Death and burial ==
In retirement, Short was a resident of San Diego, California. He died at Naval Medical Center San Diego on March 5, 1952. Short was buried at Fort Rosecrans National Cemetery in San Diego.

== Family ==
In 1901, Short married Hortense DuBois Wilson in Omaha, Nebraska. They were the parents of a daughter, Hortense Wilson, who was the wife of Major General Verne D. Mudge.

== Awards ==
Short was a recipient of the Silver Star Citation for his Spanish–American War Service, which was upgraded to the Silver Star when that decoration was created in 1918. In addition, he received the Purple Heart for the wounds he sustained in the Battle of San Juan Hill after the award was created in 1917.
