= 315th Cavalry Regiment =

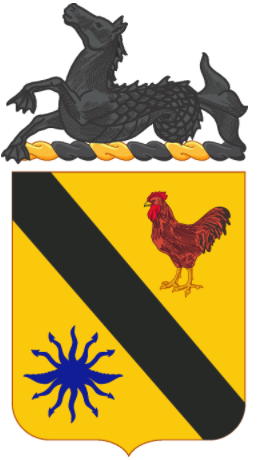
- Coat of Arms of the 315th Cavalry Regiment
- Active: March–August 1918; 1922–1943
- Country: United States
- Branch: United States Army
- Type: Cavalry
- Part of: 64th Cavalry Division (1921–1942)
- Garrison/HQ: Boston (1940–1941)
- Motto: "See Only Victory"

Commanders
- Notable commanders: Norman S. Case

Insignia
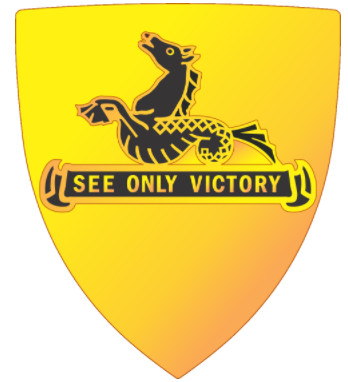
- Distinctive Unit Insignia

The 315th Cavalry Regiment was a cavalry unit of the United States Army during World War I and the interwar period. It was activated in early 1918 but broken up later that year to form new artillery units. The unit was recreated as a Rhode Island, Connecticut, Vermont, and Massachusetts Organized Reserve unit during the interwar period. It was disbanded after the United States entered World War II.

== History ==
Shortly after the United States entered World War I, the regiment was constituted in the National Army on 18 May 1917 and organized on 30 March 1918 at Fort D.A. Russell, commanded by Colonel Walter Cowen Short. It was broken up on 19 August 1918 into the 71st and 72nd Field Artillery Regiments and the 24th Trench Mortar Battery. All three artillery units were demobilized at Camp Knox on 30 January 1919.

On 15 October 1921, the 71st and 72nd Field Artillery and the 24th Trench Mortar Battery were reconstituted in the Organized Reserve as the 315th Cavalry Regiment, part of the 64th Cavalry Division in the Fifth Corps Area. On 14 November, it was transferred to the First Corps Area. The 315th was initiated (activated) on 19 January 1922 with regimental headquarters at Providence, Rhode Island, 1st Squadron at Hartford, Connecticut, and 2nd Squadron at New Haven, Connecticut. In 1923, a regimental band was initiated at Providence. In July 1924, the regiment participated in a mounted march alongside the 1st Squadron, 3rd Cavalry Regiment from Fort Devens to Fort Ethan Allen. On 15 April 1926, the 1st Squadron was moved to Providence and the 2nd Squadron to Boston. At the time, regimental units were scattered over Rhode Island, eastern Massachusetts, and southern Vermont and New Hampshire. It was reorganized as a three-squadron regiment on 1 July 1929, with the new 3rd Squadron being initiated at Boston from the men of the disbanded 158th Machine Gun Squadron. Simultaneously, the 2nd Squadron moved back to New Haven. The regiment was attached to the 76th Division for organization, administration, and training between 17 October 1929 and 27 January 1930 before transferring to the 94th Division.

The 315th's Rhode Island units usually held their inactive training period meetings at Providence's Armory of Mounted Commands. Connecticut units held the meetings at the University Club in Hartford, and Massachusetts elements held the meetings at Boston's Post Office Building or the Army and Navy Club. The regiment conducted summer training at Fort Ethan Allen with the 1st Squadron, 3rd Cavalry Regiment. As an alternate form of training, it provided cavalry training to civilians at Fort Ethan Allen as part of the Citizens' Military Training Camp. The 315th's primary ROTC feeder schools were Massachusetts State College and Norwich University. At the latter, Vermont and New Hampshire units of the regiment conducted annual contact camps in the fall or winter. In the late 1930s, Senator Henry Cabot Lodge, Jr. served as an officer in the regiment. In January 1940, the regimental headquarters moved to Boston and all subordinate units were relocated to Massachusetts. After the United States entered World War II, most of its personnel were called up for active duty and the regiment was disbanded on 18 October 1943.

== Commanders ==
The 315th was commanded by the following officers:

- Colonel Walter Cowan Short (7 April–2 August 1918)
- Colonel Herbert R. Dean (19 January 1922 – 6 March 1930)
- Colonel Norman S. Case (6 March 1930–April 1938)
- Lieutenant Colonel Harold C. Thomas (April 1938–18 January 1940)

== Heraldry ==
The 315th's distinctive unit insignia was approved on 21 November 1924 and its coat of arms was approved on 26 November. Both were rescinded on 2 March 1959. The distinctive unit insignia included a 1 1/8 in (2.86 cm) gold colored metal and enamel device, which consisted of a golden shield with a black seahorse resting on a scroll with the regimental motto, "See Only Victory", in gold letters. The colors were those of the 64th Cavalry Division, the seahorses represented the seafaring heritage of New England, where it was based, and the motto was given to the regiment by its first Regular Army instructor, Colonel Francis Marshall. The regimental coat of arms included a golden shield divided by a black stripe with a red rooster in the upper right and a winged thunderbolt in the lower left. The black seahorse was the regiment's crest, placed above the shield. The rooster represented the Rhode Islands units and the winged thunderbolt represented Connecticut, alluding to the winged thunderbolt on the flag of Revolutionary War unit Tallmadge's Dragoons.
