= 3100 =

3100 may refer to:

== In general ==
- A.D. 3100, a year in the 4th millennium CE
- 3100 BC, a year in the 4th millennium BCE
- 3100, a number in the 3000 (number) range

== Other uses ==
- 3100: Run and Become (film), a 2018 documentary film about runners
- 3100 Zimmerman, an asteroid in the Asteroid Belt, the 3100th asteroid registered
- Hawaii Route 3100, a state highway
- Chevrolet 3100, a truck
- Nokia 3100, a cellphone
- Southern Pacific 3100, a diesel-electric locomotive on display at the Southern California Railway Museum

== See also ==
- 3100 series (disambiguation) including '3100 class'
- 310 (disambiguation)
