= 310 (disambiguation) =

310 may refer to:

- 310 (number)
- The year 310 AD
- The year 310 BC
- Area code 310, an area code in West Los Angeles, California
- Lenovo IdeaPad 310, a discontinued brand of notebook computers
- 310 Margarita, an asteroid
- 310: ΩΣPx0(2^18×5^18)p*k*k*k, a 2014 studio album by Bull of Heaven

== Transportation ==
- Texas State Highway 310, an 8.3-mile (13.4 km) north–south state highway located mostly within Dallas
- 310 Motoring, an automotive customization garage based in Los Angeles

=== Vehicles ===
==== Automobiles ====
- Ferrari F310, a Formula One racing car
- Baojun 310, a subcompact hatchback

==== Aircraft ====
- Airbus A310, a passenger aircraft
- Cessna 310, a twin-engine monoplane

==== Watercraft ====
- USS S. P. Lee (DD-310), a destroyer
- USS Batfish (SS-310), a submarine

==== Locomotive ====
- British Rail Class 310, an electric multiple-unit passenger train

== See also ==
- 310th (disambiguation)
