= Sidney Howe Short =

American engineer

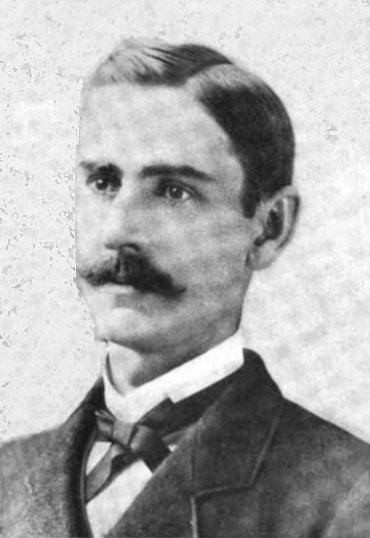
- Short in 1880
- Born: October 8, 1857; Columbus, Ohio, US
- Died: October 21, 1902 (aged 45); London, England
- Burial place: Woodlawn Cemetery, Bronx, New York
- Education: Ohio State University
- Occupations: Electrical engineer, inventor, businessman
- Spouse(s): Mary Frank Morrison, (married 1881–)
- Relatives: John Thomas Short(brother); Walter Cowen Short (brother)

Sidney Howe Short (October 8, 1857 – October 21, 1902) was an electrical engineer, inventor, physicist, professor and businessman. He is known for the development of electric motors and electric railway equipment. His inventions were so successful that even his competitors dubbed him "The Trolley King". He also developed telephone equipment much like that of Alexander Graham Bell. As a businessman he was president, key engineer, or advisor of different companies related to electrical equipment. It is claimed that he had nearly as many electrical innovations as Thomas Edison.

== Early life ==
Short was born on October 8, 1857, in Columbus, Ohio. He was the second son of John Short (a manufacturer) and Elizabeth (Cowen) Short. He attended the Columbus public schools as a child. He followed in his father's footsteps in mechanical technology through his father's manufacturing business in his preteen years, as he showed that he had an aptitude towards electrical and mechanical technology at this time.

Short experimented with various electrical devices at his home. One such item was a central distributor station that wound all the house clocks at the same time electrically. One day lightning hit the house and burned out his ingenious device and destroyed all the house clocks. He then constructed a burglar alarm system that had bells on the headboard of his bed. It was easily set off and often produced false alarms during the night. This caused much disturbance for the family. The house was never actually burglarized so his apparatus was not used for its intended purpose. However, from these electrical experiments he became an expert telegraph operator at the age of fourteen.

== Mid-life ==
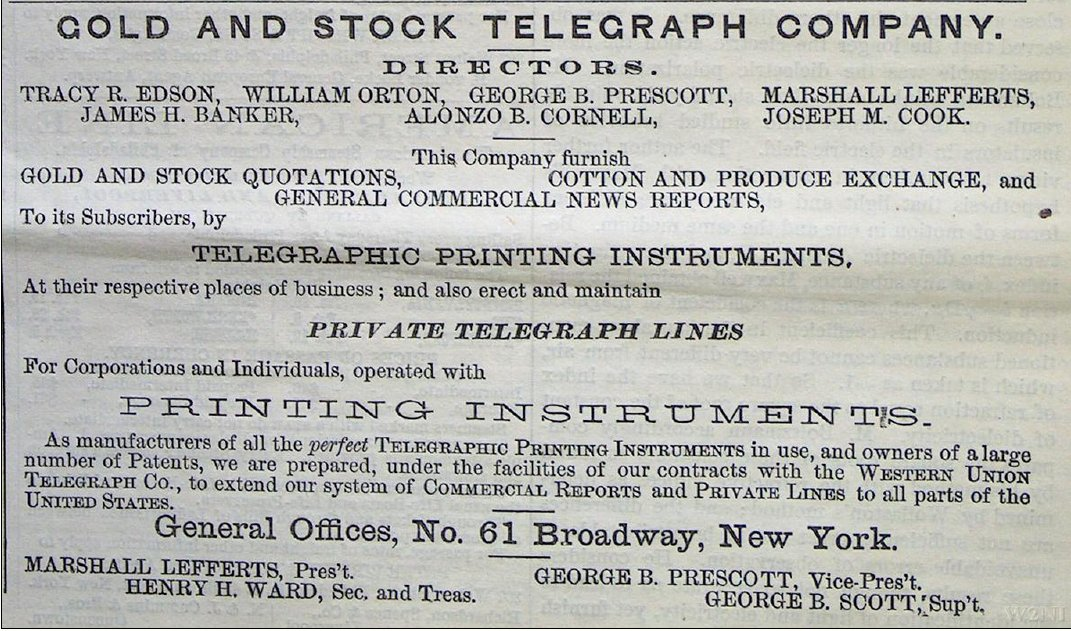
Gold and Stock Telegraph Company 1874 advertisement

Short first attended Capital University for a few semesters after graduating from high school. He then attended Ohio State University and was an early student to enter the university soon after its opening in 1870. His main studies were mechanics and electricity. While at Ohio State he took a temporary position as laboratory director in the physics department when the regular professor took a new position in Japan. This was in 1876 until a successor was elected to fill the position in 1879. During this time, Short made an elaborate model of a railroad locomotive that was adored by his students.

He attended the Centennial Exposition in Philadelphia in 1876. He saw the Alexander Graham Bell telephone exhibit and discovered the principle of the apparatus was basically the same as that of a similar device he had been experimenting with at the laboratory of Ohio State University. He then developed his device into a long-distance telephone transmitter and patented it in 1879. He then sold his patent rights to Gold and Stock Telegraph Company.

Short graduated from Ohio State University with a Bachelor of Science degree in 1880. He taught electrical engineering and physics at Ohio State University for two years. He then worked in the physics and chemistry departments at University of Denver, where he taught as a professor for five years. He was soon promoted to vice-president and expanded his departments. In 1882 his chemistry department was branched off and he concentrated on teaching and researching physics.

== Family ==
He was married in Washington, D.C., July 26, 1881, to Mary F. Morrison, of Columbus, Ohio, and had three sons and one daughter.

== Achievements ==
Short's technical writings were well known, and he was a prolific inventor. Despite a relatively short career, he received over 500 patents on electrical machinery worldwide on electrical devices and telephone equipment, mechanical improvements to streetcars and railroad equipment improvements. He did many things related to electrical and streetcars. He designed and produced the first electric motor that operated a streetcar without gears. The motor had its armature direct-connected to the streetcar's axle for the driving force thereby eliminating energy-wasting gears.

He pioneered the use of a conduit system of a concealed electrical third rail and cabling thereby eliminating the necessity of overhead wire, trolley poles and a dangerous exposed electrified third rail of street cars and trolley railways. While at University of Denver he conducted important experiments which established that multiple unit powered cars were a better way to operate trains and trolleys. He later resigned his professorship at the University of Denver and gave his entire attention to street railway work. He built a number of street railway lines in the western cities of the United States using both the underground conduit and overhead electrical trolley systems.

Short interested the electrician Charles Francis Brush into investing into his electrical inventions and electrical machinery improvements. They formed a new company called Brush Electric Company in 1883. In 1885 he pursued an interest in electrical apparatus construction, and development of electric railway equipment. This developed into the formation of the Short Electrical Railway Company in Ohio in 1889. At Cleveland he became a key electrical engineer of Brush Electric Company. Short Electrical Railway Company merged with General Electric in 1892, and Short became a key member of its Technical Board. In 1893 he left those positions and went to Cleveland to become vice-president of Walker Company in charge of their engineering department. This led to his design of motors and generators, which business developed quickly and later merged into Westinghouse Company.

In December 1898, he sailed for Europe to complete arrangements that had already been under discussion for some time with Dick Kerr and Company. This was for the manufacture in England of electrical apparatus from his patents. He then held the position of technical director of the English Electric Company while living in London. Towards the end of his life, Short was also in the process of constructing large shops in Paris for the manufacture of machinery using his patents.

== Society membership ==
Short was a Fellow of the American Society for the Advancement of Science, a member of the Cleveland Electrical Society, the American Institute of Electrical Engineers, the Institution of Electrical Engineers in London, the Engineering Society of Liverpool, and the New York Electrical Society. He was a member of the United States Electrical Congress in 1884 at Philadelphia, the International Congress of Electricians at Chicago in 1893, and the International Congress of Electricity in Paris in 1900.

== Later life and death ==
Short emigrated to England in 1898; he died in London on October 21, 1902, from appendicitis.

== Legacy ==
His inventions, innovations and appliances were so successful that even his competitors dubbed him "The Trolley King". It was claimed by The Dayton Herald that he had patented nearly as many electrical innovations as Thomas Edison.
