= 310th Armored Cavalry Regiment =

- Active: 1949–1950
- Country: United States
- Branch: United States Army
- Type: Cavalry
- Role: Reconnaissance
- Garrison/HQ: Los Angeles

The 310th Armored Cavalry Regiment (310th ACR) was a California-based reconnaissance unit of the United States Army Organized Reserve Corps, which briefly existed after World War II. It was constituted in 1948, partially organized from existing units in 1949, and inactivated in 1950.

== History ==
The 310th Armored Cavalry was constituted on 21 October 1948 in the Organized Reserve Corps, and partially organized from existing units. Its headquarters and headquarters company (HHC) was redesignated on 2 May 1949 from the headquarters and headquarters troop (HHT) of the 310th Cavalry Group, Mechanized, which had been constituted on 21 April 1944 as HHT, 29th Cavalry Group and activated on 1 May 1944 at Fort Riley. After being inactivated there on 6 February 1945, it was redesignated HHT, 310th Cavalry Group, Mechanized in the Organized Reserves on 23 December 1946 before being activated on 20 January 1947 at Los Angeles.

The 1st Battalion was redesignated on 5 March 1949 from the 318th Mechanized Cavalry Reconnaissance Squadron. It was originally constituted on 5 August 1917 during World War I in the National Army as the headquarters of the 179th Infantry Brigade of the 90th Division. Organized at Camp Travis, the brigade was sent to France with the 90th Division as part of the American Expeditionary Forces, fighting in the Battle of Saint-Mihiel, the Meuse-Argonne Offensive, and the Lorraine Campaign. Demobilized on 18 June 1919 at Camp Pike, it was reconstituted in the Organized Reserves as HHC, 179th Infantry Brigade on 24 June 1921 in the Eighth Corps Area. It was initiated (activated) on 26 November 1921 at Fort Worth, Texas.

After the United States entered World War II, the company was converted into the 90th Reconnaissance Troop, without 3rd Platoon, on 30 January 1942. It was ordered into active service without personnel at Camp Barkeley on 25 March. It was expanded into the 90th Reconnaissance Squadron, Mechanized, on 15 September and relieved from the 90th Motorized Division on 7 May 1943. It was redesignated on 22 December 1943 as the 36th Cavalry Reconnaissance Squadron, Mechanized. The 36th fought in the Rhineland Campaign and the Central Europe Campaign attached to the 11th Cavalry Group. It was inactivated on 26 October 1945 at Camp Patrick Henry and redesignated the 318th Mechanized Cavalry Reconnaissance Squadron on 23 December 1946. Activated at Hollywood on 20 January 1947, it became part of the Organized Reserves.

The HHC was inactivated on 30 November 1950 at Los Angeles. The 1st Battalion was redesignated the 36th Reconnaissance Battalion and the remainder of the regiment was disbanded on 10 March 1952. The 310th ACR did not inherit the lineage of the prewar 310th Cavalry Regiment, and was not authorized a coat of arms or distinctive unit insignia.
