= 311th Armored Cavalry Regiment =

- Active: 1948–1950
- Country: United States
- Branch: United States Army
- Type: Cavalry
- Role: Reconnaissance
- Garrison/HQ: Fort Worth

The 311th Armored Cavalry Regiment (311th ACR) was a Texas and Louisiana-based reconnaissance unit of the United States Army Organized Reserve Corps, which briefly existed after World War II. It was constituted in 1948, partially organized from existing units later that year, and inactivated in 1950.

== History ==
The 311th Armored Cavalry was constituted on 26 November 1948 in the Organized Reserve Corps, and partially organized on 17 December 1948 from existing units. Its headquarters and headquarters company (HHC) was redesignated from the headquarters and headquarters troop (HHT) of the 311th Cavalry Group, Mechanized, which had been constituted on 12 June 1944 as the 122nd Cavalry Reconnaissance Troop and activated on 21 June at the Presidio of San Francisco. After being inactivated at Camp Cooke on 14 November 1945, it was redesignated HHT, 311th Cavalry Group, Mechanized in the Organized Reserves on 2 January 1947 before being activated 8 January at Fort Worth.

The 1st Battalion was redesignated from the 319th Mechanized Cavalry Reconnaissance Squadron. It was first constituted on 21 April 1944 as the 127th Cavalry Reconnaissance Squadron and activated on 1 May at Fort Riley. It was disbanded on 26 October but reconstituted on 2 January 1947 in the Organized Reserves and activated on 17 January 1947 at New Orleans. On 17 January 1949, the 1st Battalion was moved to Monroe. In January 1950, the battalion was commanded by Major Robert E. Foster, Jr. The 1st Battalion inactivated on 8 March 1950 at Monroe, followed by its HHC and Company C on 13 October. The regiment's HHC was inactivated on 22 November at Fort Worth. The 311th ACR was disbanded on 10 March 1952.

The 311th ACR did not inherit the lineage of the prewar 311th Cavalry Regiment, and was not authorized a coat of arms or distinctive unit insignia.
