= 312th Cavalry Regiment =

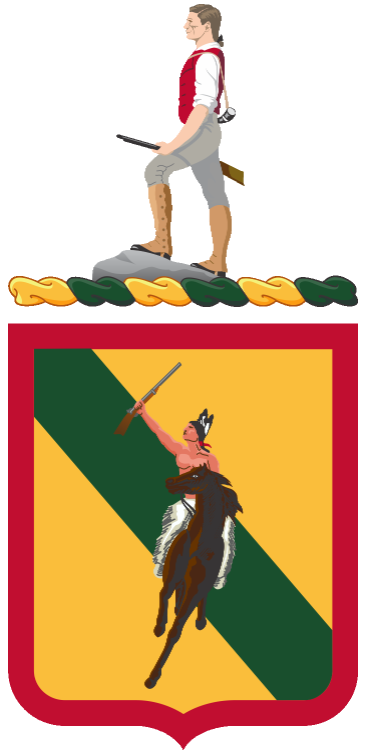
- Coat of Arms of the 312th Cavalry Regiment
- Active: March–August 1918; 1922–1942
- Country: United States
- Branch: United States Army
- Type: Cavalry
- Part of: 63rd Cavalry Division (1921–1942)
- Garrison/HQ: Oklahoma City (1922–1941)
- Motto: "Omnia Virtute" (All by Valor)

Insignia
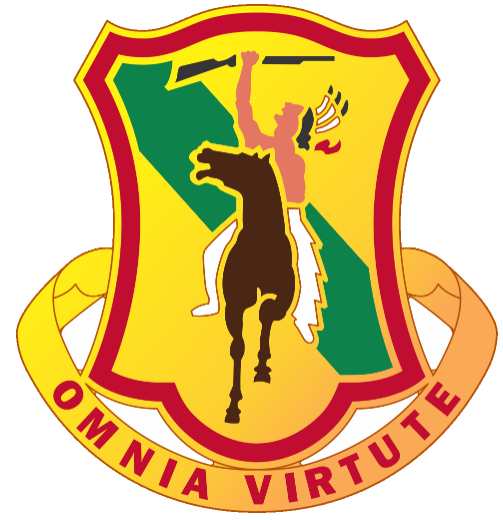
- Distinctive Unit Insignia

The 312th Cavalry Regiment was a cavalry unit of the United States Army during World War I and the interwar period. It was activated in early 1918 but broken up later that year to form new artillery units. The unit was recreated as an Oklahoma, Arizona, New Mexico, and Colorado Organized Reserve unit during the interwar period. It was converted into a signal aircraft warning regiment after the United States entered World War II.

== History ==
Shortly after the United States entered World War I, the regiment was constituted in the National Army on 18 May 1917, and organized in separate elements in early 1918. Elements of the 312th were organized on 12 February at Fort Sheridan, Illinois, on 13 March at Fort Myer, and on 23 March at Fort D.A. Russell. Colonel Walter Cowen Short led the regiment through its initial organization and training and its conversion to artillery. The Fort Myer elements became the 60th Field Artillery Regiment on 13 August, the Fort Sheridan elements became the 61st Field Artillery Regiment on 14 August, and the Fort D.A. Russell element became the 28th Trench Mortar Battery on 14 August. The 28th Trench Mortar Battery was assigned to the 90th Division and was demobilized on 17 December 1918 at Camp Jackson; the 61st Field Artillery joined the 97th Division and was demobilized at Camp Jackson in January 1919; the 60th Field Artillery joined the 20th Division and was demobilized at Camp Jackson in February 1919.

On 15 October 1921, the 60th and 61st Field Artillery and the 28th Trench Mortar Battery were reconstituted in the Organized Reserve as the 312th Cavalry Regiment, part of the 63rd Cavalry Division in the Second Corps Area. It was transferred to the Eighth Corps Area on 14 November. The 312th was initiated (activated) on 23 August 1922 with regimental headquarters and 1st Squadron at Oklahoma City, and 2nd Squadron at Douglas, Arizona. The regiment joined the division's 156th Cavalry Brigade. In 1925, the 2nd Squadron relocated to Flagstaff, Arizona. It was reorganized on 1 July 1929 as a three-squadron regiment, with the new 3rd Squadron activated at Denver from personnel of the disbanded 156th Machine Gun Squadron. On 22 August, the 2nd Squadron moved yet again to Ponca City, Oklahoma. The 2nd Squadron was relocated to Tucson, Arizona in March 1937 and its subordinate troops were reorganized in Arizona, New Mexico, and west Texas with men from the 3rd Squadron, 311th Cavalry Regiment, which was concurrently moved to Dallas.

The regiment's 3rd Squadron usually held its inactive training period meetings at the Kitteridge Building or the Argonaut Hotel in Denver. Regular equestrian training was conducted by officers in central and western Oklahoma at the Fort Reno Remount Depot on the depot's horses. The regiment, except 2nd Squadron, conducted summer training at Fort Bliss with the 7th Cavalry Regiment. From 1929 to 1936, the 2nd Squadron conducted summer training at Fort Huachuca with the 10th Cavalry Regiment. Its designated mobilization training station was Fort McIntosh, while the 2nd Squadron's was Fort Ringgold. The 312th's primary ROTC feeder schools were the Oklahoma Military Academy, the New Mexico Military Institute, and the University of Arizona.

The 312th provided 30 officers to the 1st Cavalry Division and the 111th Cavalry Regiment for the 1938 Third Army maneuver at Fort Bliss. Several regimental officers observed the 7th Cavalry Brigade in the September 1939 annual Fifth Corps Area maneuver at Fort Knox. After the United States entered World War II, the regiment was converted into the 548th Signal Aircraft Warning Regiment on 30 January 1942. The regiment was disbanded on 11 November 1944.

== Commanders ==
The 312th was commanded by the following officers:

- Colonel Francis Le J. Parker (18 April–11 June 1918)
- Major Phil M. Hunt (23 August–22 September 1922)
- Lieutenant Colonel Donald R. Bonfoey (22 September 1922–December 1923)
- Colonel Karl E. Linderfelt (December 1923–May 1933)
- Lieutenant Colonel Ralph O. Baird (August–September 1935)
- Colonel Calvin S. Harrah (November 1937–January 1938)
- Lieutenant Colonel Ralph O. Baird (May–June 1940)

== Heraldry ==
The 312th's coat of arms was approved on 18 August 1925 and its distinctive unit insignia was approved on 5 November of that year. The distinctive unit insignia included a 1 1/8 in (2.86 cm) gold colored metal and enamel device, which consisted of a yellow shield with red borders. The shield was divided by a diagonal green stripe and in its center was an American Indian on horseback brandishing a carbine. The yellow shield symbolized the cavalry, and the red represented the 312th's artillery service. The green stripe symbolized New Mexico and the American Indian symbolized Oklahoma and Arizona, where the regiment was based in the interwar period. The regimental motto, "Omnia Virtute" (All by Valor), was attached to the bottom of the distinctive unit insignia. The regimental coat of arms was of a similar design to the distinctive unit insignia but included the Organized Reserve's Minuteman crest above the shield and omitted the motto.
