= 311th Cavalry Regiment =

US Army unit

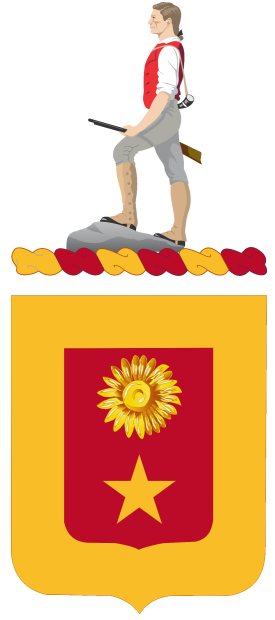
- Coat of Arms of the 311th Cavalry Regiment
- Active: February–September 1918; 1922–1942
- Country: United States
- Branch: United States Army
- Type: Cavalry
- Part of: 63rd Cavalry Division (1921–1942)
- Garrison/HQ: San Antonio (1922–1941)
- Motto: "Siempre Adelante" (Always Forward)

Insignia
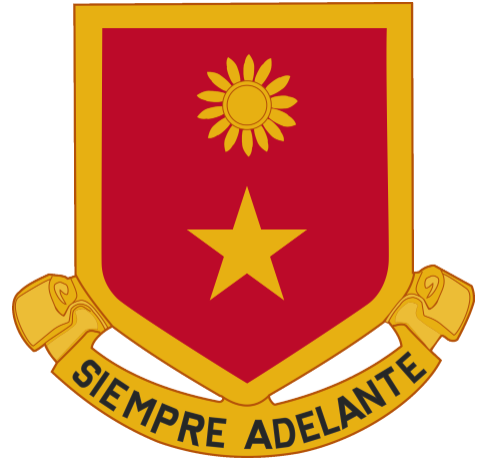
- Distinctive Unit Insignia

The 311th Cavalry Regiment was a cavalry unit of the United States Army during World War I and the interwar period. It was activated in early 1918 but broken up later that year to form new artillery units. The unit was recreated as a Texas Organized Reserve unit during the interwar period. It was disbanded after the United States entered World War II.

== History ==
Shortly after the United States entered World War I, the regiment was constituted in the National Army on 18 May 1917, and organized on 15 February 1918 at Fort Riley. However, it was broken up on 1 September and its men were used to create the 67th and 68th Field Artillery Regiments, and the 23rd Trench Mortar Battery. All three artillery units were demobilized at Camp Knox on 22 December 1918.

On 15 October 1921, the 67th and 68th Field Artillery and the 23rd Trench Mortar Battery were reconstituted in the Organized Reserve as the 311th Cavalry Regiment, part of the 63rd Cavalry Division in the Second Corps Area. It was transferred to the Eighth Corps Area on 14 November. The 311th was initiated (activated) on 23 August 1922 with regimental headquarters and 1st Squadron at San Antonio, and 2nd Squadron at Fort Worth. The regiment joined the division's 156th Cavalry Brigade. It was reorganized on 1 July 1929 as a three-squadron regiment, with the new 3rd Squadron activated at Tucson. In February 1932, regimental officers organized the Cavalry Club of the Southwest in San Antonio. The 2nd and 3rd Squadrons were moved to Houston and Dallas, respectively, in March 1937. 3rd Squadron personnel in Tucson joined the 2nd Squadron, 312th Cavalry Regiment.

The 2nd Squadron and 3rd Squadron usually held their inactive training period meetings at the Federal Building and the Jefferson Hotel's Army and Navy Club in Dallas. Headquarters and 1st Squadron held the meetings at the Smith-Young Tower in San Antonio. Headquarters and 1st Squadron also conducted regular equestrian training on the Peacock Military Academy's horses and often participated in San Antonio's annual Army Day parade. The regiment conducted summer training at Fort Clark, Texas, with the 5th Cavalry Regiment. Its designated mobilization training station was Fort Brown, and its primary ROTC feeder schools were Texas A&M University, the New Mexico Military Institute, and the University of Arizona.

In February 1938, Texas Senator Morris Sheppard was made honorary colonel of the regiment. The 311th provided 40 officers to the 1st and 56th Cavalry Brigades for the 1938 Third Army maneuver at Camp Bullis. Several regimental officers observed the 7th Cavalry Brigade in the September 1939 annual Fifth Corps Area maneuver at Fort Knox. The regiment was disbanded on 18 October 1943, after its personnel were called up for active duty during the military buildup prior to the American entry into World War II. An unrelated reserve unit, the 311th Armored Cavalry Regiment, briefly existed after the war in Texas and Louisiana.

== Commanders ==
The 311th was commanded by the following officers:

- Colonel George W. Kirkpatrick (15 February–21 August 1918)
- Lieutenant Colonel Byron L. Barger (23 August–25 October 1922)
- Colonel Thomas H. Barton (26 October 1922–June 1925)
- Lieutenant Colonel Byron L. Barger (June 1925–1 October 1926)
- Colonel Calvin S. Harrah (1 October 1926–May 1933)
- Lieutenant Colonel Harry B. Rhodes (July 1936–March 1937)
- Lieutenant Colonel Homer E. Carrico (June 1937–August 1941)

== Heraldry ==
The 311th's coat of arms was approved on 15 July 1925 and its distinctive unit insignia was approved on 15 September of that year. Both were rescinded on 2 February 1959. The distinctive unit insignia included a 1 1/8 in (2.86 cm) gold colored metal and enamel device, which consisted of a red shield with gold borders. A gold sunflower was depicted above a gold star in the center of the shield. The yellow border of the shield symbolized the cavalry, and the red represented the 311th's artillery service. The sunflower represented Kansas, where the regiment was organized, and the star symbolized Texas, where it was based in the interwar period. The regimental motto, "Siempre Adelante" (Always Forward), was attached to the bottom of the distinctive unit insignia. The regimental coat of arms was of a similar design to the distinctive unit insignia but included the Organized Reserve's Minuteman crest above the shield and omitted the motto.
