= 310th Cavalry Regiment =

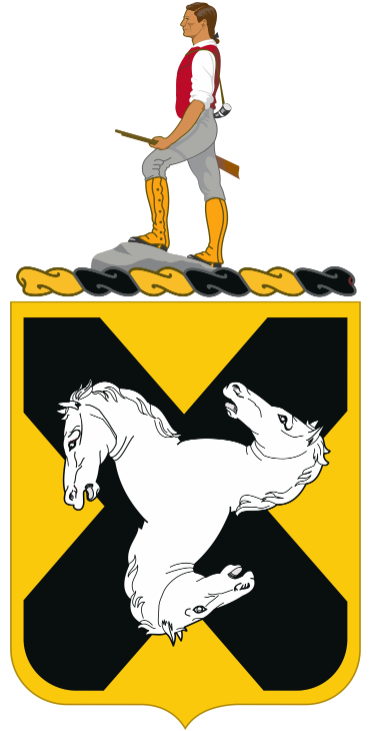
- Coat of Arms of the 310th Cavalry Regiment
- Active: February–October 1918; 1922–1942
- Country: United States
- Branch: United States Army
- Type: Cavalry
- Part of: 63rd Cavalry Division (1921–1942)
- Garrison/HQ: Athens (1929–1941)
- Motto: "Fidelis" (Faithful)

Insignia
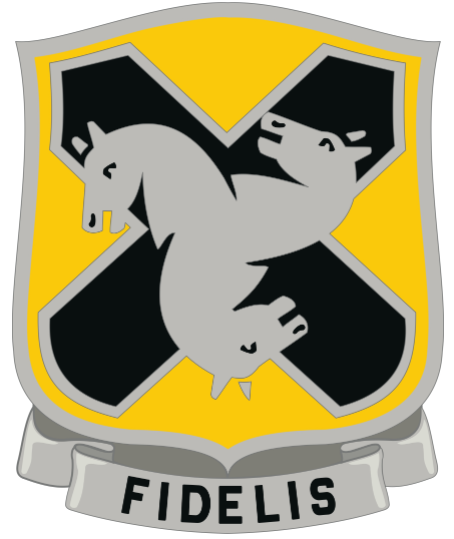
- Distinctive Unit Insignia

The 310th Cavalry Regiment was a cavalry unit of the United States Army during World War I and the interwar period. It was activated in early 1918 but broken up later that year to form new artillery units. The unit was recreated as a Tennessee Organized Reserve unit during the interwar period, and later moved to Georgia in the early 1930s. It was disbanded after the United States entered World War II.

== History ==
Shortly after the United States entered World War I, the regiment was constituted in the National Army on 18 May 1917, and organized on 17 February 1918 at Fort Ethan Allen. However, it was broken up on 18 October and its men were used to create the 58th and 59th Field Artillery Regiments, and the 20th Trench Mortar Battery. All three artillery units were demobilized at Camp Jackson on 10 February 1919.

On 15 October 1921, the 58th and 59th Field Artillery and the 20th Trench Mortar Battery were reconstituted in the Organized Reserve as the 310th Cavalry Regiment, part of the 63rd Cavalry Division in the Fourth Corps Area. The 310th was initiated (activated) on 2 February 1922 with regimental headquarters at Knoxville, 1st Squadron at Chattanooga, and 2nd Squadron at Nashville. The regiment joined the division's 155th Cavalry Brigade. It was reorganized on 1 July 1929 as a three-squadron regiment, and its headquarters was relocated to Athens on 22 October 1929. The entire regiment was simultaneously moved to northeast Georgia.

The regiment conducted summer training at Camp McClellan, Alabama, and Fort Oglethorpe, Georgia, with the 6th Cavalry Regiment. As an alternate form of training, the 309th provided basic cavalry military instruction to civilians under the Citizens' Military Training Camp program at Fort Oglethorpe. Its designated mobilization training station was Fort Oglethorpe, and its primary ROTC feeder school was the University of Georgia.

The regiment was disbanded on 18 October 1943, after its personnel were called up for active duty during the military buildup prior to the American entry into World War II. An unrelated reserve unit, the 310th Armored Cavalry Regiment, briefly existed after the war in California.

== Commanders ==
The 310th was commanded by the following officers:

- Colonel Julius T. Conrad (6 April–24 September 1918)
- Colonel J. Perry Fyffe (2 February 1922 – 25 June 1923)
- Colonel Richard H. Kimball (25 June 1923 – 18 January 1926)
- Lieutenant Colonel Robert D. McDonald (18 January 1926–December 1929)
- Colonel Warren A. Fair (December 1929–April 1933)
- Lieutenant Colonel Hugh D. Blanchard (July–August 1939)

== Heraldry ==
The 310th's coat of arms and distinctive unit insignia were approved on 23 September 1932, and both rescinded on 2 February 1959. The distinctive unit insignia included a 1 1/8 in (2.86 cm) gold colored metal and enamel device, which consisted of a yellow shield with cut off saltires in the shape of an "X" in the center, and three conjoined horse's heads over the saltires. The yellow shield symbolized the cavalry, while the saltires and the horse's heads represented the regiment's number, 310. The regimental motto, "Fidelis" (Faithful), was attached to the bottom of the distinctive unit insignia. The regimental coat of arms was of a similar design to the distinctive unit insignia but included the Organized Reserve's Minuteman crest above the shield and omitted the motto.
