= CP Class 3100 =

The Série 3100 were a class of three-carriage electric multiple unit trains used by Portuguese Railways (CP) on the line between Cascais, Estoril and Cais do Sodre station in Lisbon, Portugal. The line is electrified at 1,500 V DC - unique in Portugal (where the railways are mostly electrified at 25 kV 50 Hz).

The units were built by Cravens of Sheffield in 1950, but extensively modernised along its history adding components such as: Multiple Train Operation, and removing the buffers that these units had originally. They were retired in the early 2000s, and a couple of them were preserved by the "Museo Nacional Ferroviario", but because of its deterioration, the public entity decided to scrap the two remaining units.
