= MRTC 3100 class =

Light rail vehicle built by CRRC Dalian

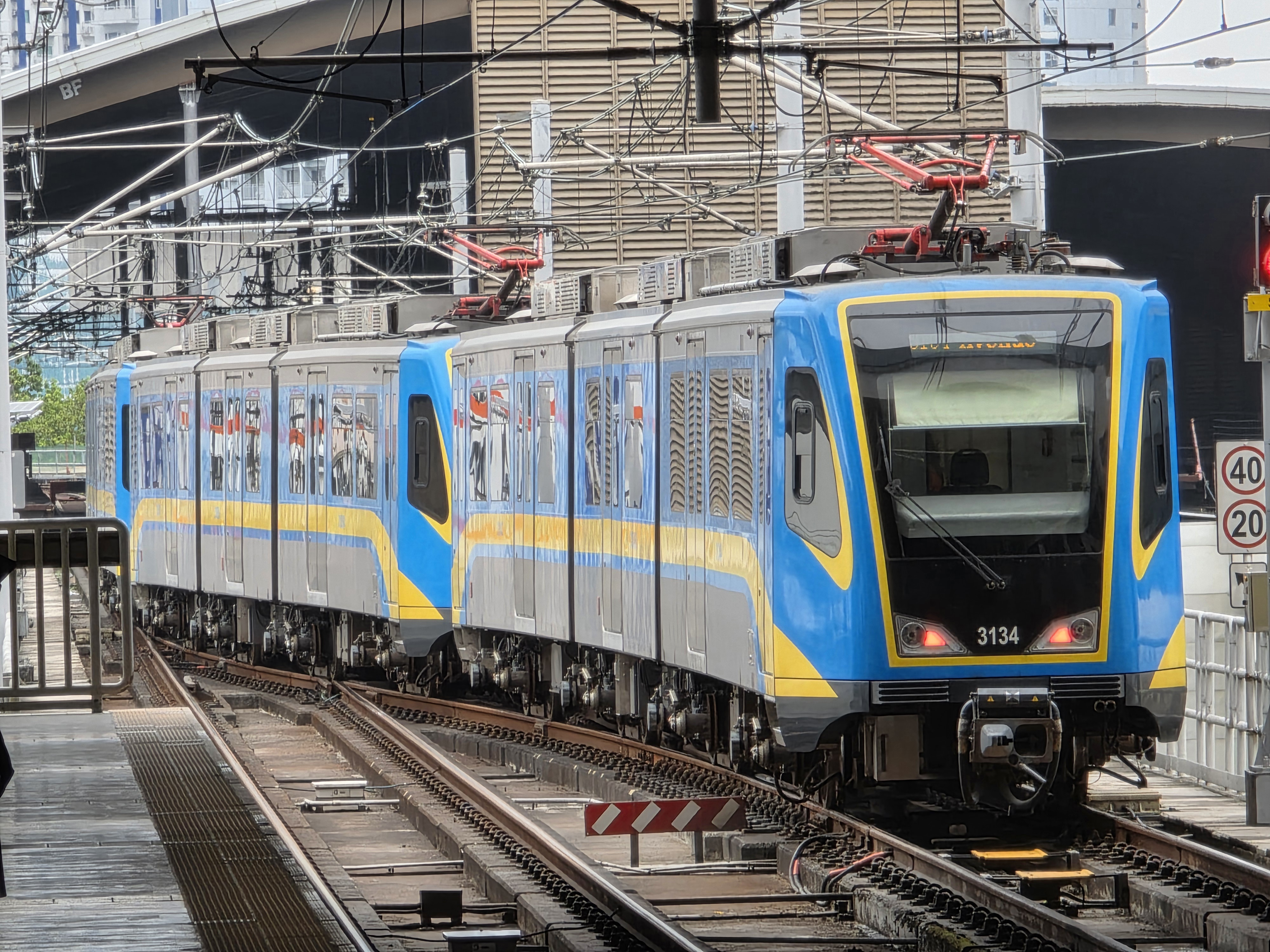
- A 3100 class (8MLB) train in a three-car formation at North Avenue station

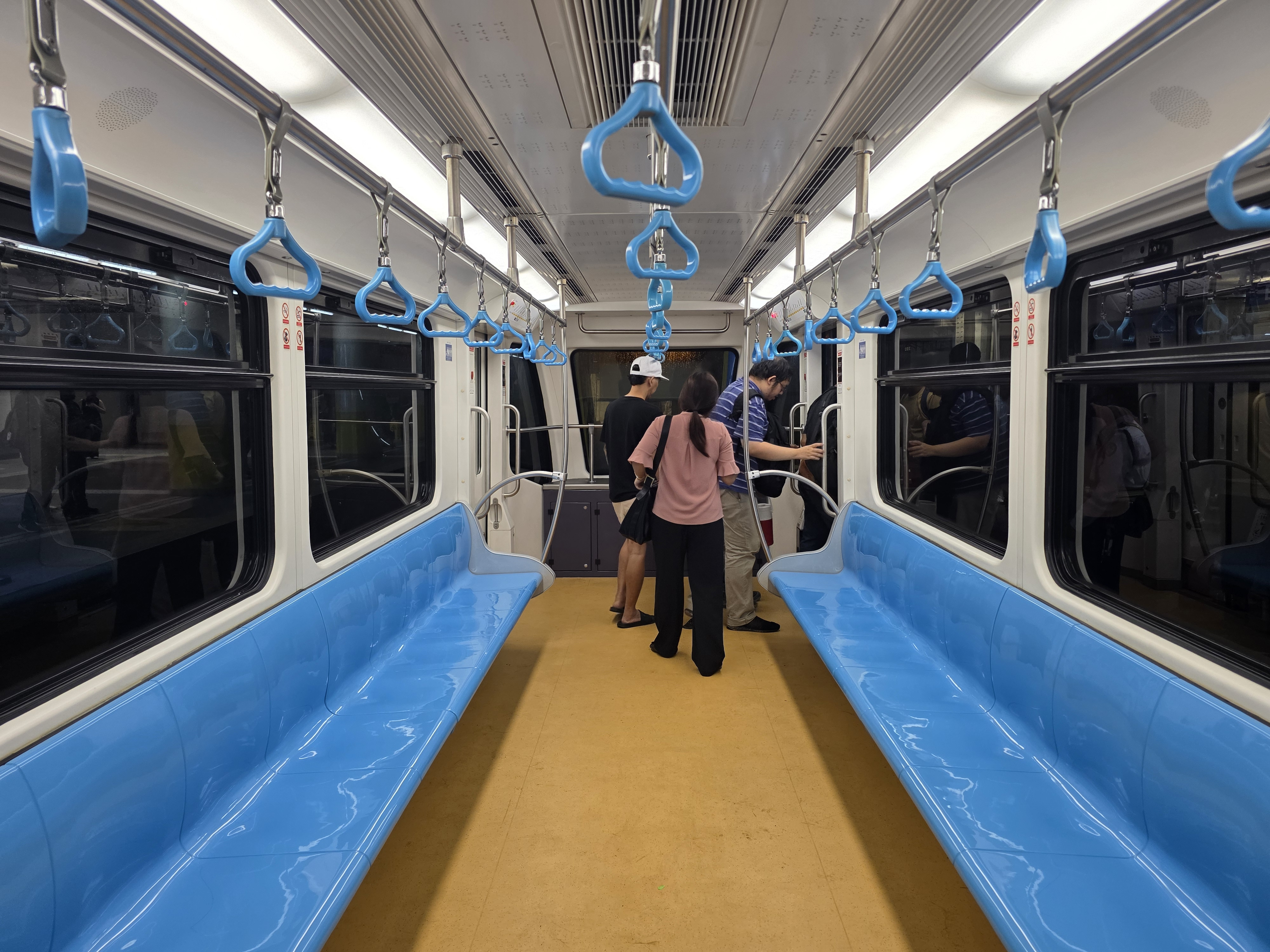
- Train interior in July 2025
- Stock type: Light rail vehicle
- In service: 2016; 2018–2019; 2020–2021; 2022; July 16, 2025–present
- Manufacturer: CNR/CRRC Dalian
- Assembly: Dalian, Liaoning, China
- Order no.: LOT1
- Constructed: 2015–2017
- Entered service: May 7, 2016; 10 years ago
- Number built: 48 vehicles
- Number in service: 7 vehicles (2 sets); 1 4-car set 1 3-car set
- Formation: 3/4 cars per trainset
- Design code: 8MLB
- Fleet numbers: 3101–3148
- Capacity: 394 per car (74 seats); 1,182–1,576 per train
- Operator: Department of Transportation
- Depot: North Avenue
- Line served: Line 3

Specifications
- Car body construction: Stainless steel
- Train length: 95.16 m (312 ft 2 29/64 in) (3 cars); 126.88 m (416 ft 3 9/32 in) (4 cars)
- Car length: 31.72 m (104 ft 13/16 in)
- Width: 2.5 m (8 ft 2 27/64 in)
- Height: 3.73 m (12 ft 2 27/32 in)
- Floor height: 0.925 m (3 ft 27/64 in)
- Platform height: 0.9 m (2 ft 11 7/16 in)
- Doors: Double-leaf plug-type; 5 per side: Width: 861–1,255 mm (34–49 in); Height: 1,900 mm (75 in)
- Articulated sections: 3
- Wheel diameter: 700–595 mm (28–23 in) (new–worn)
- Wheelbase: 1.9 m (6 ft 2 51/64 in)
- Maximum speed: 65 km/h (40 mph) (design); 60 km/h (37 mph) (service)
- Weight: 49.7 t (110,000 lb) (tare); 75.2 t (166,000 lb) (laden)
- Axle load: 9.4 t (21,000 lb)
- Steep gradient: 4–5%
- Traction system: Voith IGBT–VVVF
- Traction motors: 4 × Traktionssysteme Austria TMR 36-28-4 120 kW (160 hp) 3-phase AC induction (1 hour rating: 477 V 186 A 2379 rpm)
- Power output: 480 kW (640 hp) per car; 1.44 MW (1,930 hp) (3 cars); 1.92 MW (2,570 hp) (4 cars)
- Transmission: Quill drive
- Acceleration: 1.03 m/s^{2} (3.4 ft/s^{2})
- Deceleration: 1.1 m/s^{2} (3.6 ft/s^{2}) (service); 1.5 m/s^{2} (4.9 ft/s^{2}) (emergency)
- Auxiliaries: Static converter
- HVAC: ShiJiaZhuang King roof-mounted duct-type air-conditioning
- Electric systems: 750 V DC overhead catenary
- Current collection: Single-arm pantograph
- UIC classification: Bo′+2′+2′+Bo′
- Bogies: Inside frame-type
- Minimum turning radius: 25 m (82 ft)
- Braking systems: Knorr-Bremse regenerative and rheostatic
- Safety systems: Alstom CITYFLO 250 fixed block with subsystems of EBICAB 900 ATP, EBI Screen 900 CTC, and EBI Lock 950 CBI
- Coupling system: Scharfenberg Type 330
- Headlight type: LED lamp
- Seating: Longitudinal
- Track gauge: 1,435 mm (4 ft 8 1/2 in) standard gauge

Notes/references
- Sourced from unless otherwise noted.

The MRTC 3100 class or CRRC Dalian 8MLB LRV is the class of second-generation uni-directional (Note: They are uni-directional in the sense of having a distinguishable front and back, where one end has both the cab and the pantograph. However, they can travel at either direction at full speed as a train via multiple-unit train control should they be connected together facing opposite directions.) light rail vehicles (LRVs) built by CRRC Dalian. Owned by the Philippine government and operated by the Department of Transportation (DOTr), these are used on Line 3 of the Manila Metro Rail Transit System since 2016.

The trains were involved in legal issues and numerous controversies owing to its weight and incompatibility with the existing system, which the Metro Rail Transit Corporation (MRTC) raised that same year. The trains remained idle as these issues persisted, but in 2018, limited deployment commenced. It was repeatedly pulled from service and deployed erratically between 2019 and 2022, before being revived for regular operations in 2025.

== History ==
=== Background and purchase ===
With the ridership of the Line 3 already peaking at almost half of its 350,000 original daily capacity, there have been calls to purchase additional trains as early as 2008. Initially, in February 2013, the government was looking at buying 52 second-hand trains from Madrid Metro and Inekon Trams to immediately augment the problem, but after evaluation, the plan was dropped in June due to less advantageous timelines for delivery and higher maintenance costs.

The first of three contracts of the Line 3 capacity expansion project, (Note: The other two covered the upgrade of the line's ancillary systems (power supply, overhead catenary, and railway tracks), and the signaling system.) which involves the procurement of 48 light rail vehicles, was opened for bidding on February 22, 2013. Sumitomo Corporation—the maintenance provider of the MRT-3 from 1999 to 2012—expressed interest in bidding for the contract. Among the firms that tendered were CSR Zhuzhou Electric Locomotive (later CRRC Zhuzhou Locomotive) and CNR Dalian Locomotive & Rolling Stock (later CRRC Dalian). CSR Zhuzhou was disqualified by the Department of Transportation and Communications (DOTC; later the Department of Transportation). CNR Dalian was the only firm left in the bidding process, and the firm was awarded the ₱3.8 billion contract on January 16, 2014.

=== Production and initial commissioning ===
The first prototype, LRV 3101, arrived at the Port of Manila on August 14, 2015, and was assembled at LRT Line 1's Baclaran Depot on September 3. It was then hauled to Line 3's North Avenue Depot, where it arrived on September 5. CNR Dalian delivered all 48 train vehicles from 2016 to 2017, with some trains assembled at Taft Avenue station using a temporary track extension, and at Line 1's Baclaran Depot.

The first train was scheduled to enter revenue service at the end of March 2016 but delays in its 5,000-kilometer (3,100 mi) test run had delayed its deployment. Nevertheless, these were deployed for the first time on May 7, 2016.

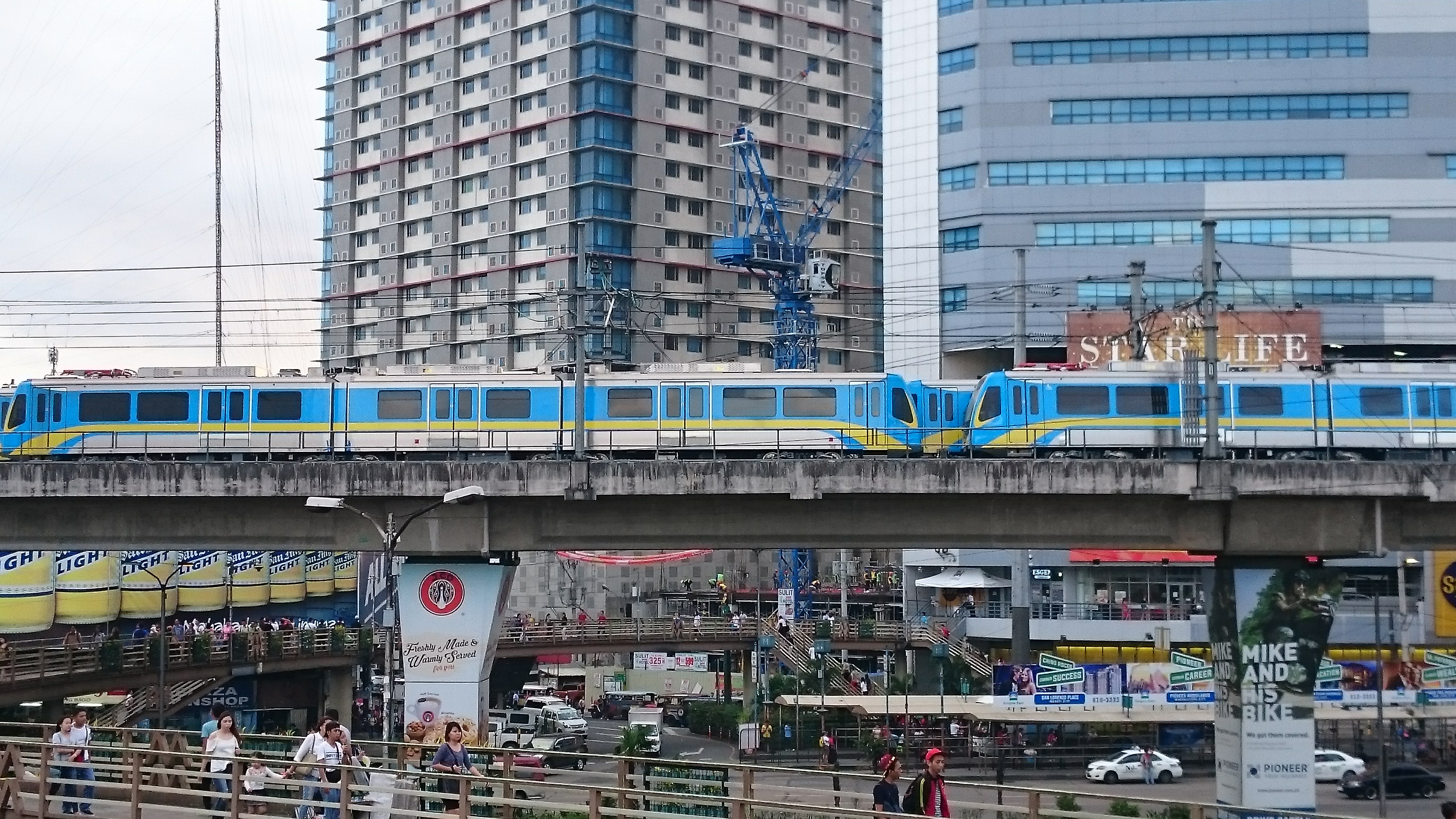
From 2016 to 2017, some railcars were parked beyond the buffer stop of the MRT-3 along the LRT Line 1 tracks before they were taken to its own depot.

On March 15, 2017, the Transportation Undersecretary for Railways, Cesar Chavez, said that the 3100 class trains could not be used until 2018 due to lack of signaling equipment and the necessary infrastructure upgrades needed to run the trains. On April 25, Chavez announced another delay, pushing back full deployment to 2020.

=== Limited deployments ===
On October 27, 2018, the 3100 class trains officially entered service after numerous tests and audits, with the deployment of the first train on the same day for 150-hour validation testing until November 21. The second trainset was deployed from December 11 to 23, and the third was deployed from January 23 to February 1, 2019, and in March. The validation tests were conducted by the Philippine National Railways and Toshiba Infrastructure Systems.

The 3100 class trains were subsequently pulled out of service and later stayed idle. In May 2019, Sumitomo Corporation took over as MRT Line 3's maintenance provider. Under its contract with the Department of Transportation (DOTr), it prohibits the use of the Dalian trains; if not, Sumitomo imposes penalties to the DOTr. Both parties later signed a consent for its limited deployment in the evening, which commenced on October 15, 2019. Initially planned to conclude by the end of the month, the DOTr extended it through November to further evaluate its performance, but said that test runs would be suspended to accommodate rail replacement works. By December, it added a deployment period in the afternoon off-peak hours in addition to the evening off-peak hours to cater more passengers for the Christmas season.

On June 1, 2020, the DOTr deployed three Dalian train sets, which remained in service until May 25, 2021. Subsequently, one of the Dalian LRVs was sent to Mitsubishi Heavy Industries's testing facility in Mihara, Hiroshima Prefecture in Japan for further tests and audits. After a ten-month hiatus, one of the trainsets returned to revenue service on March 28, 2022, before being idled again.

==== 2025–2026 redeployment ====
On July 16, 2025, President Bongbong Marcos led the fifth redeployment of the Dalian trains, with one trainset deployed during the weekday peak hours. Marcos also ordered the DOTr to expedite further inspections and adjustments to the unused trains. On August 26, 2025, the DOTr deployed a four-car 3100 class train for revenue service. These remained in service until September.

Transportation Secretary Vince Dizon later confirmed in a media interview on DZMM that two additional 3-car train sets were undergoing final tests. Plans were also laid to deploy the trains during non-peak hours after initial testing during peak hours. Meanwhile, full deployment was planned for 2026, once the remaining 39 cars were put to service.

After a three-month hiatus, the DOTr redeployed one Dalian trainset on Christmas Day. The Dalian trainsets were inactive from December 27, 2025 until January 16, 2026, when the DOTr announced that starting January 16, they would be deploying one 3-car trainset during off-peak hours on weekdays.

== Design ==
The LRV design is a one-way eight-axle motorized car consisting of three articulated sections, which are connected to each other by the joint and the cover.

=== Car body ===
The car body is made of stainless steel with a livery of sky blue and yellow fascia. Dimensions are nearly the same to the RT8D5M, which are also built for single-ended operations. It is connected by a Jacobs bogie and a gangway in each railcar section.

Each light rail vehicle has three roof-mounted air-conditioning units. In total, there are nine air-conditioning units in a three-car train set.

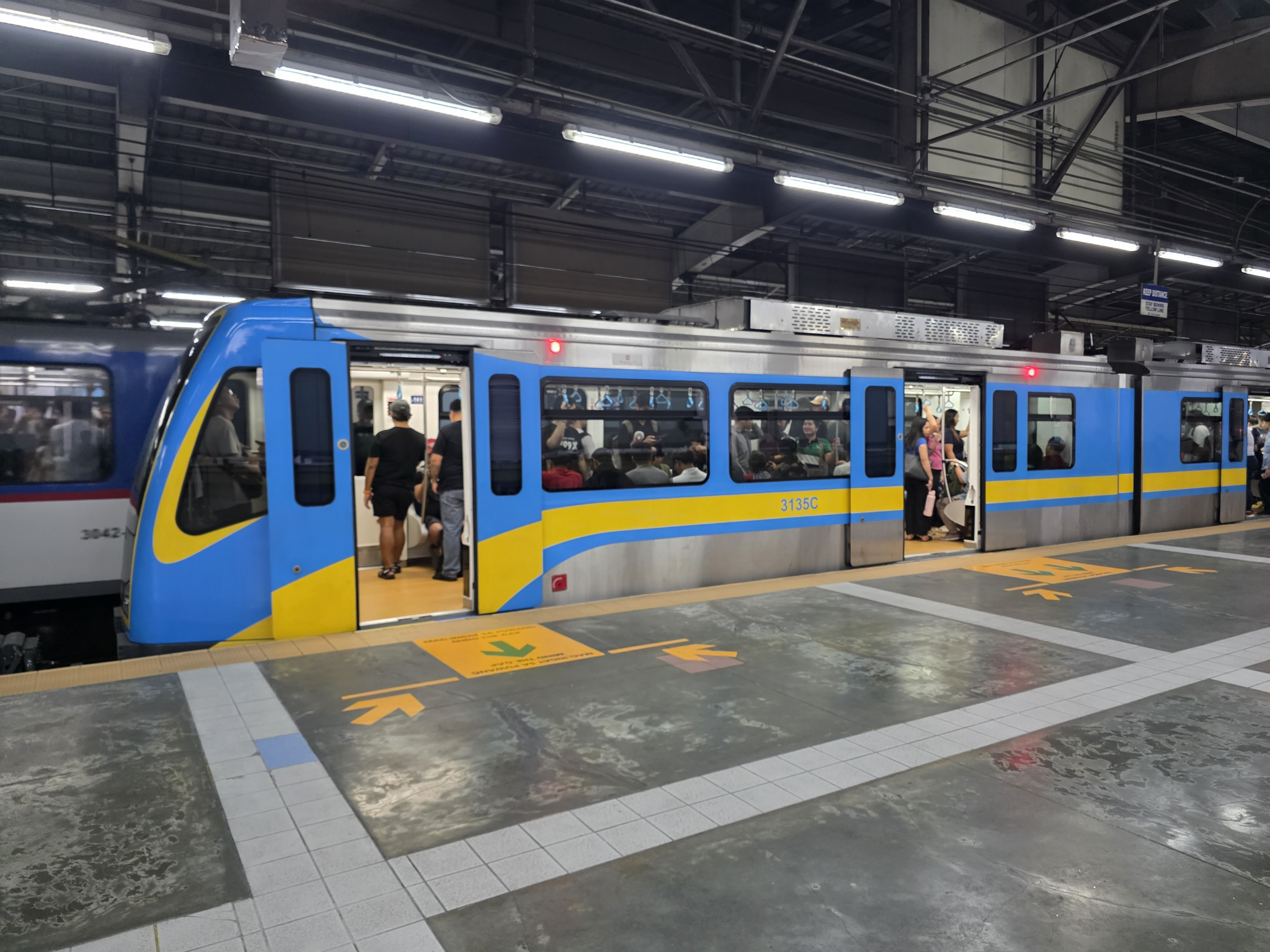
Car body with doors open

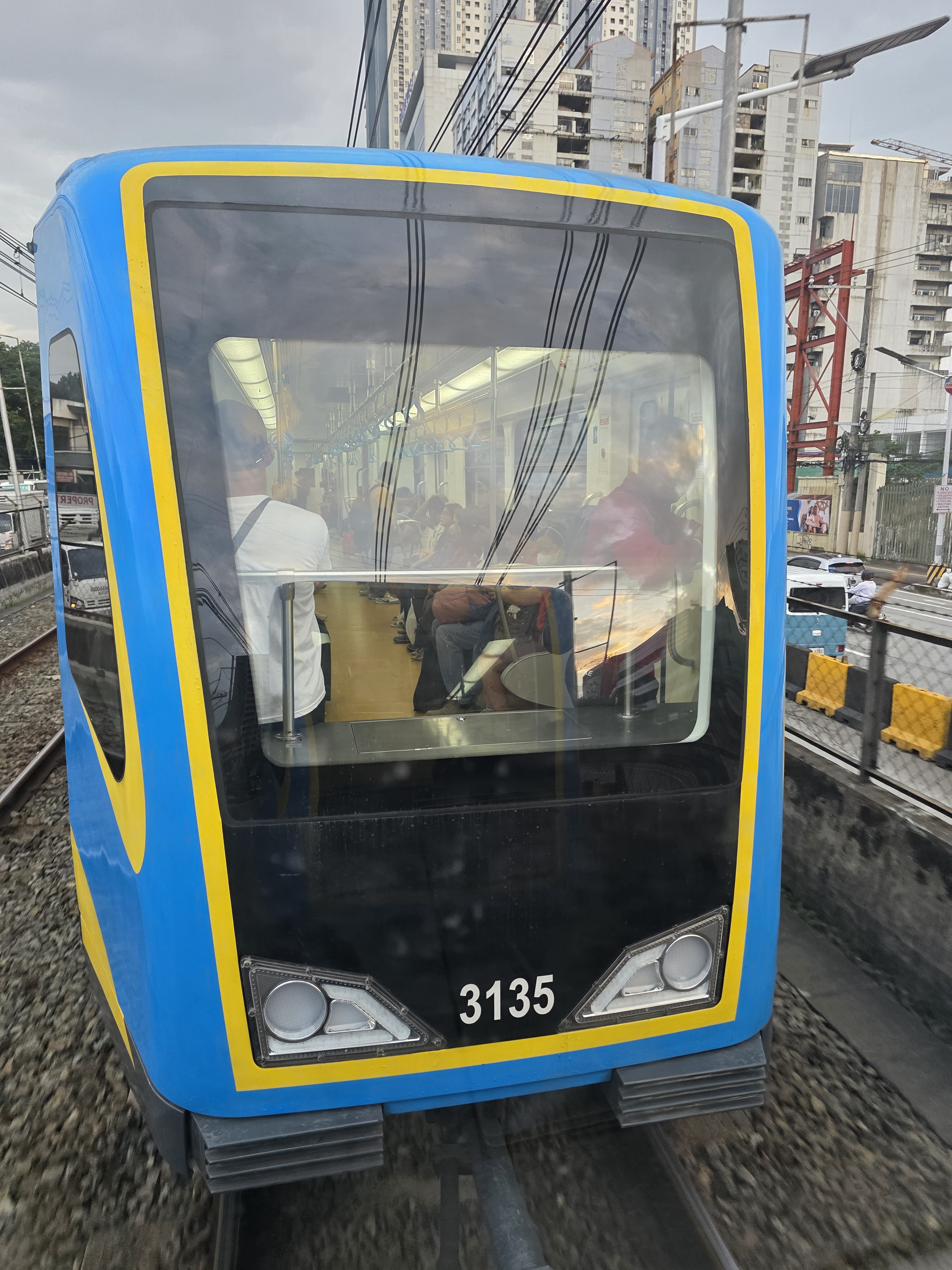
Non-driving cab with anti-climbers

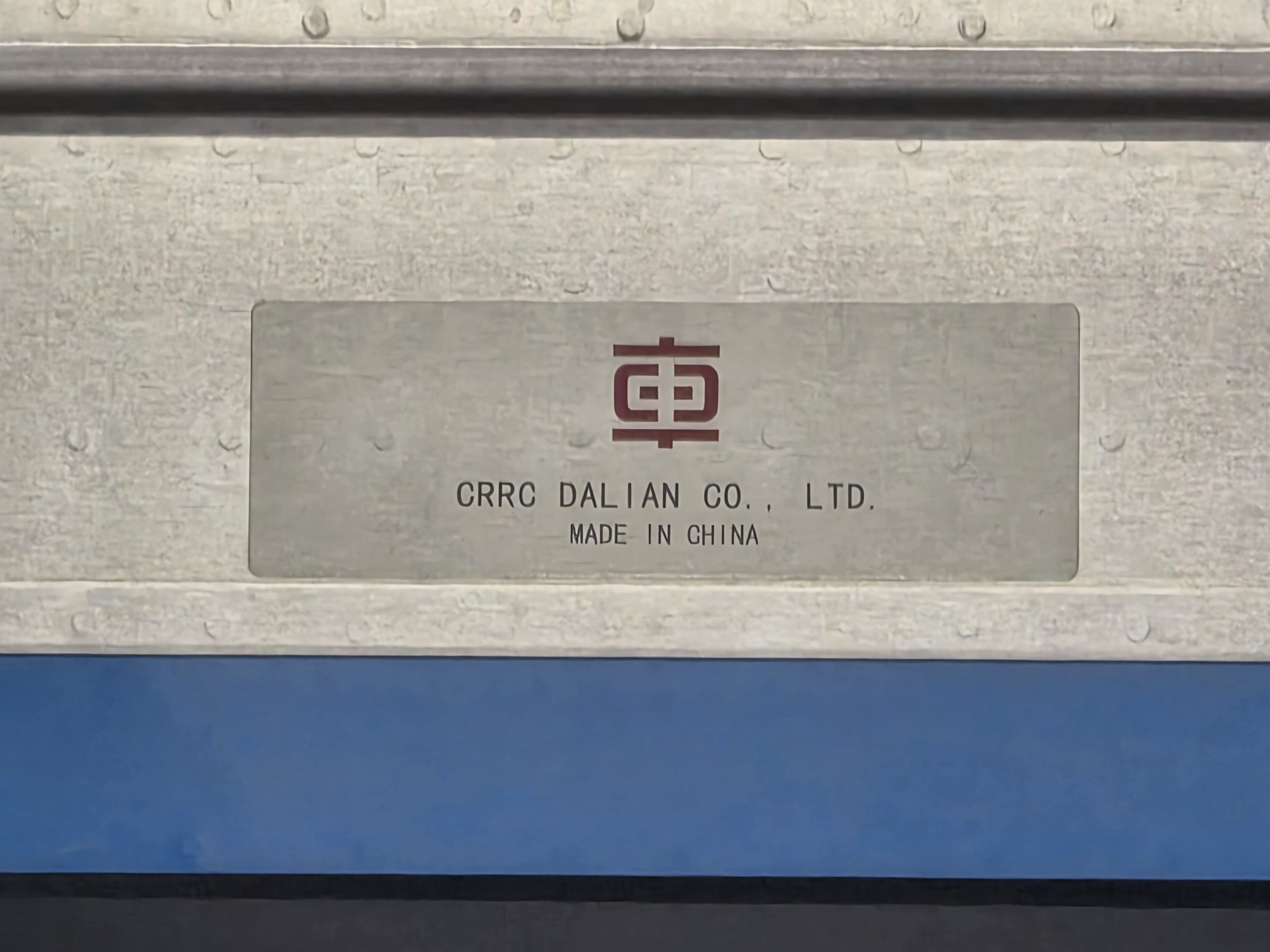
Manufacturer's plate

=== Interior ===
Each railcar is provided with five double leaf, electronically operated, plug-sliding doors. The three center doors have an open width of 1,255 mm (49.4 in) while the two end doors at 861 mm (33.9 in).

Each train car has a capacity of 394 passengers. A 3-car trainset can accommodate 1,182 passengers. Two wheelchair-compatible spaces are provided beside the driver cab of each LRV, each provided with seatbelts to prevent the wheelchair from moving around while the train is in motion. The sides of the doors are equipped with fire extinguishers. The trains also have an equipped passenger emergency alarm button in case of an emergency.

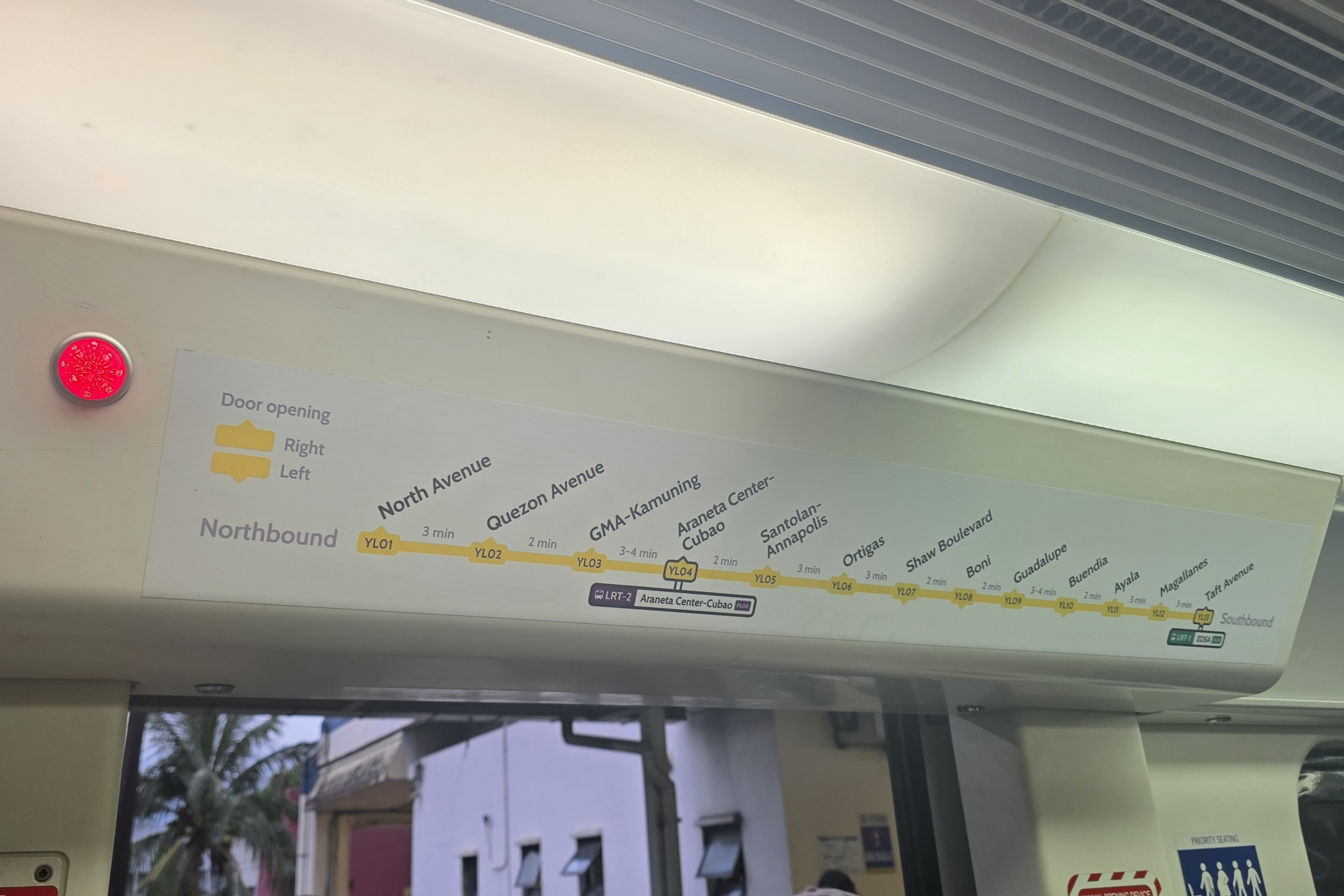
Line map and a light indicator on the left

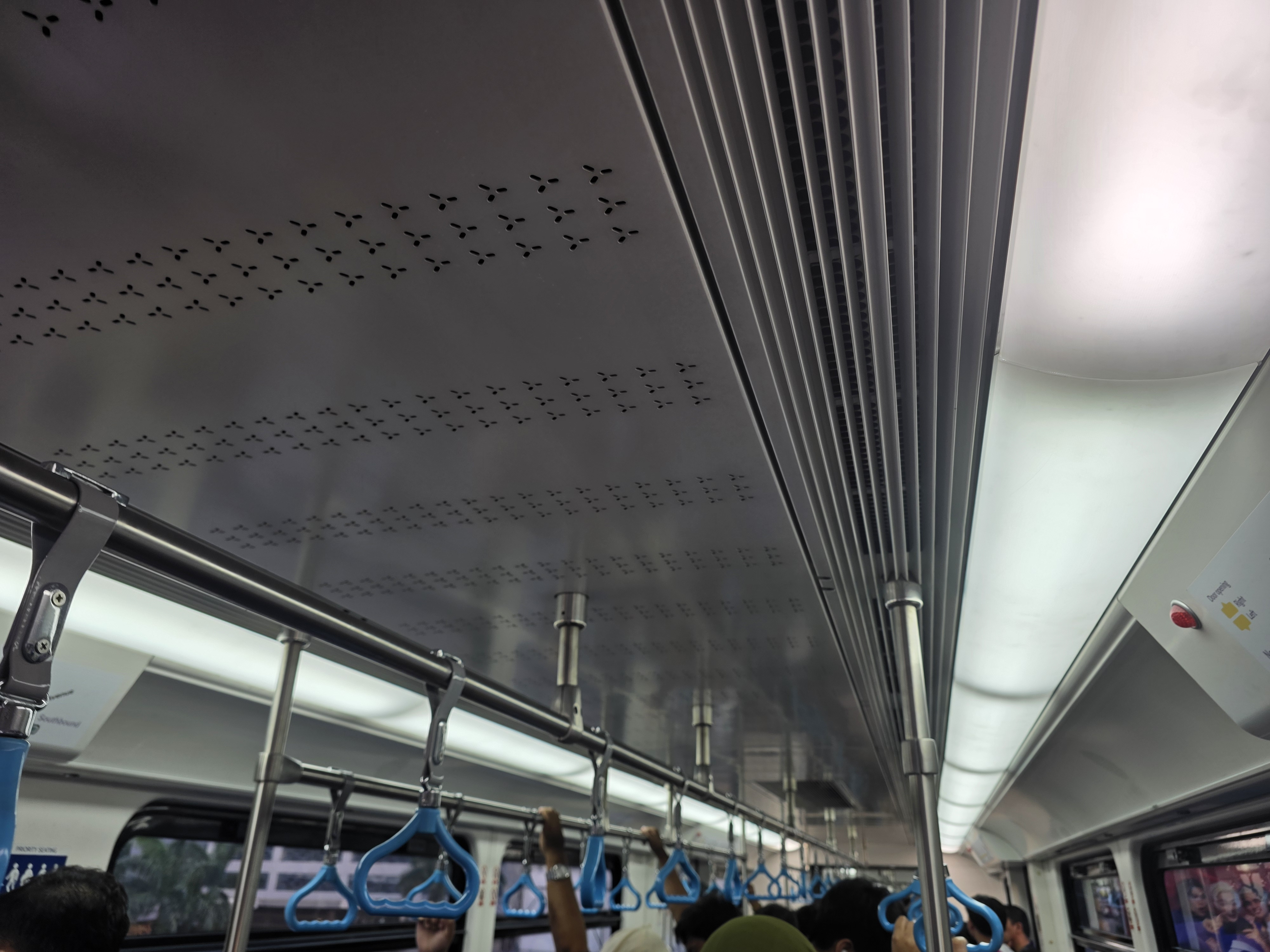
Interior roof design

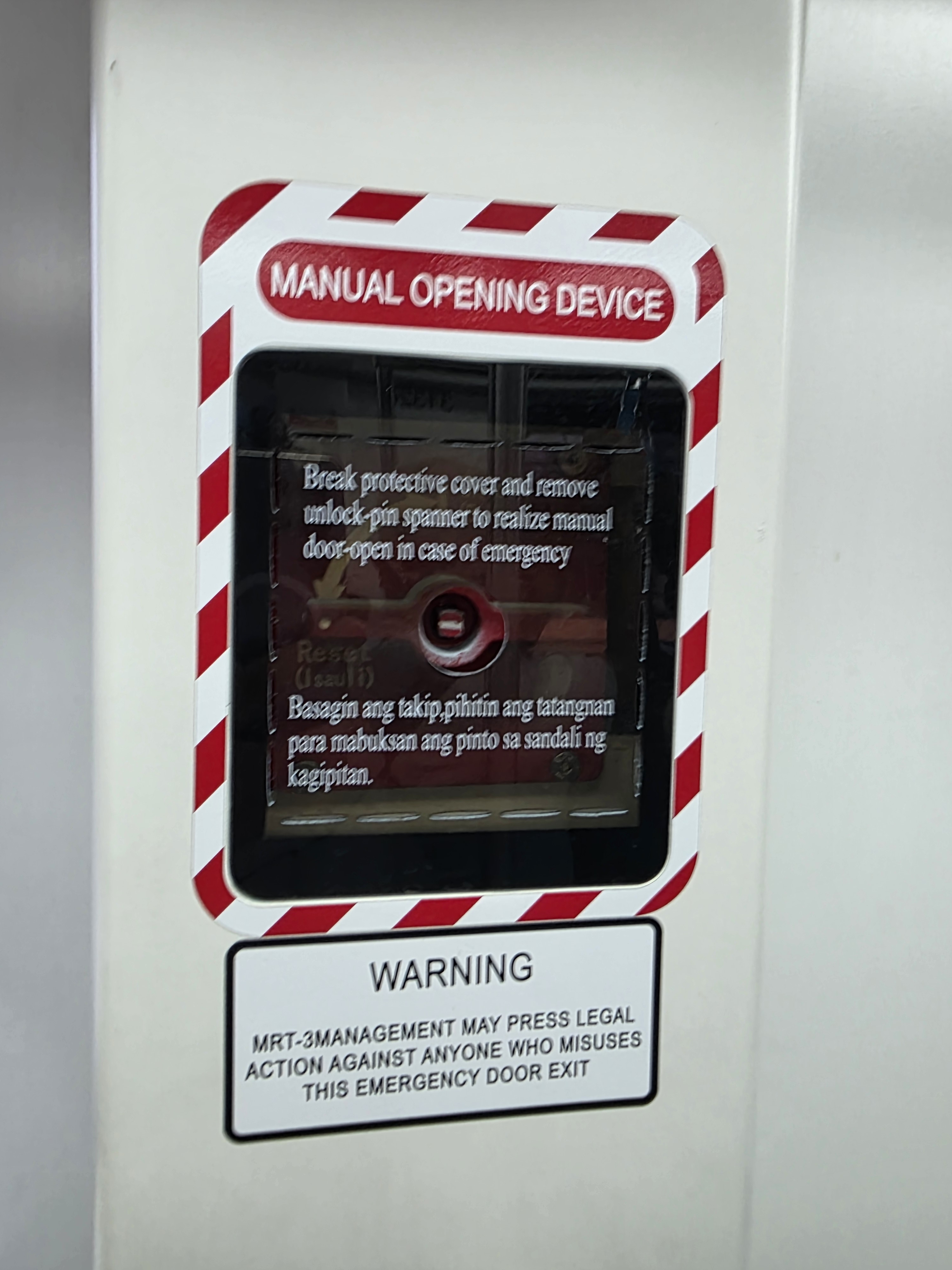
Emergency door handle

=== Mechanical ===
Each LRV has four bogies consisting of two motorized bogies at the ends of the LRV and two shared trailer bogies under the articulations. Scharfenberg couplers manufactured by Voith are present in each vehicle.

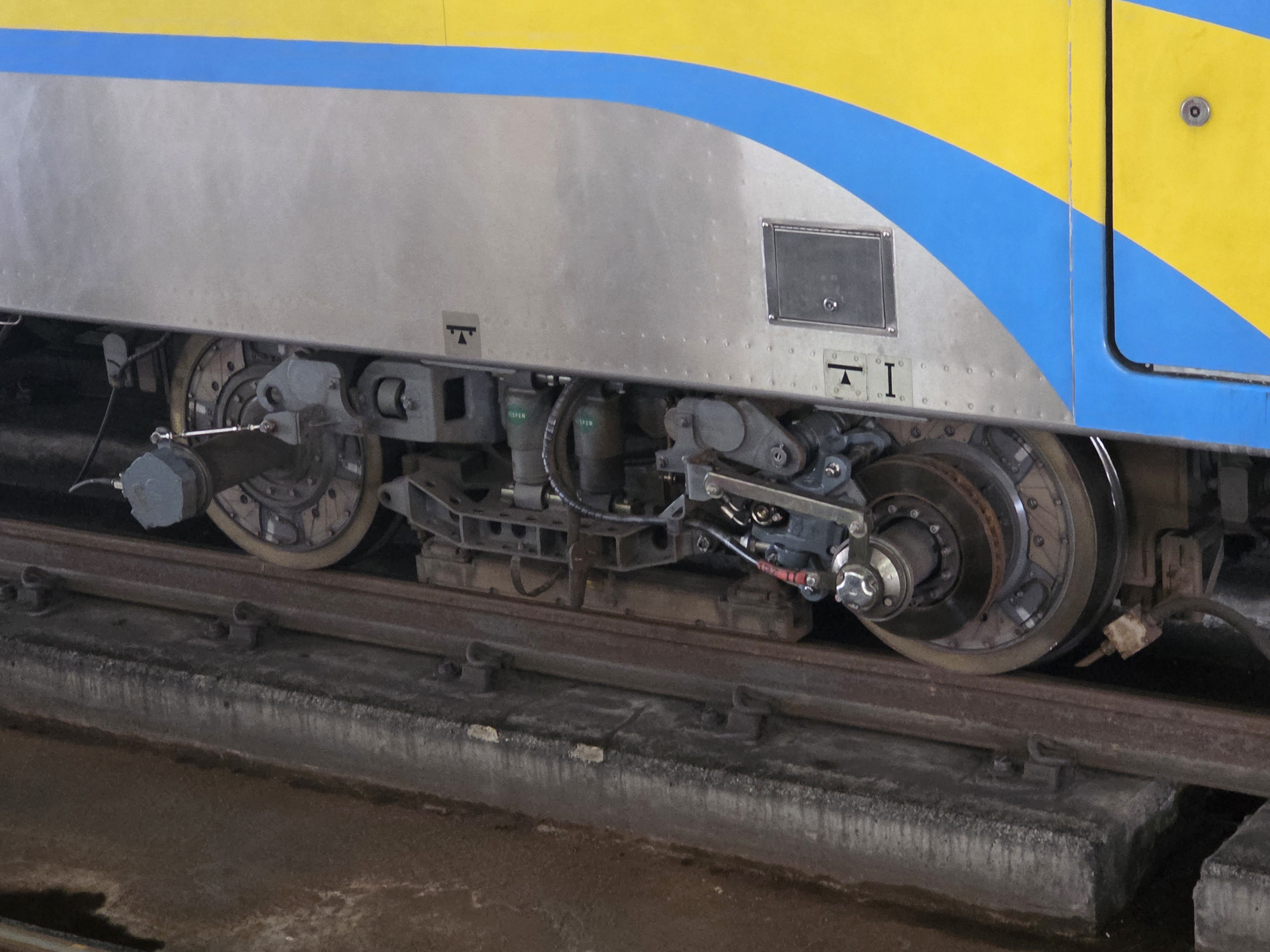
Motorized bogie

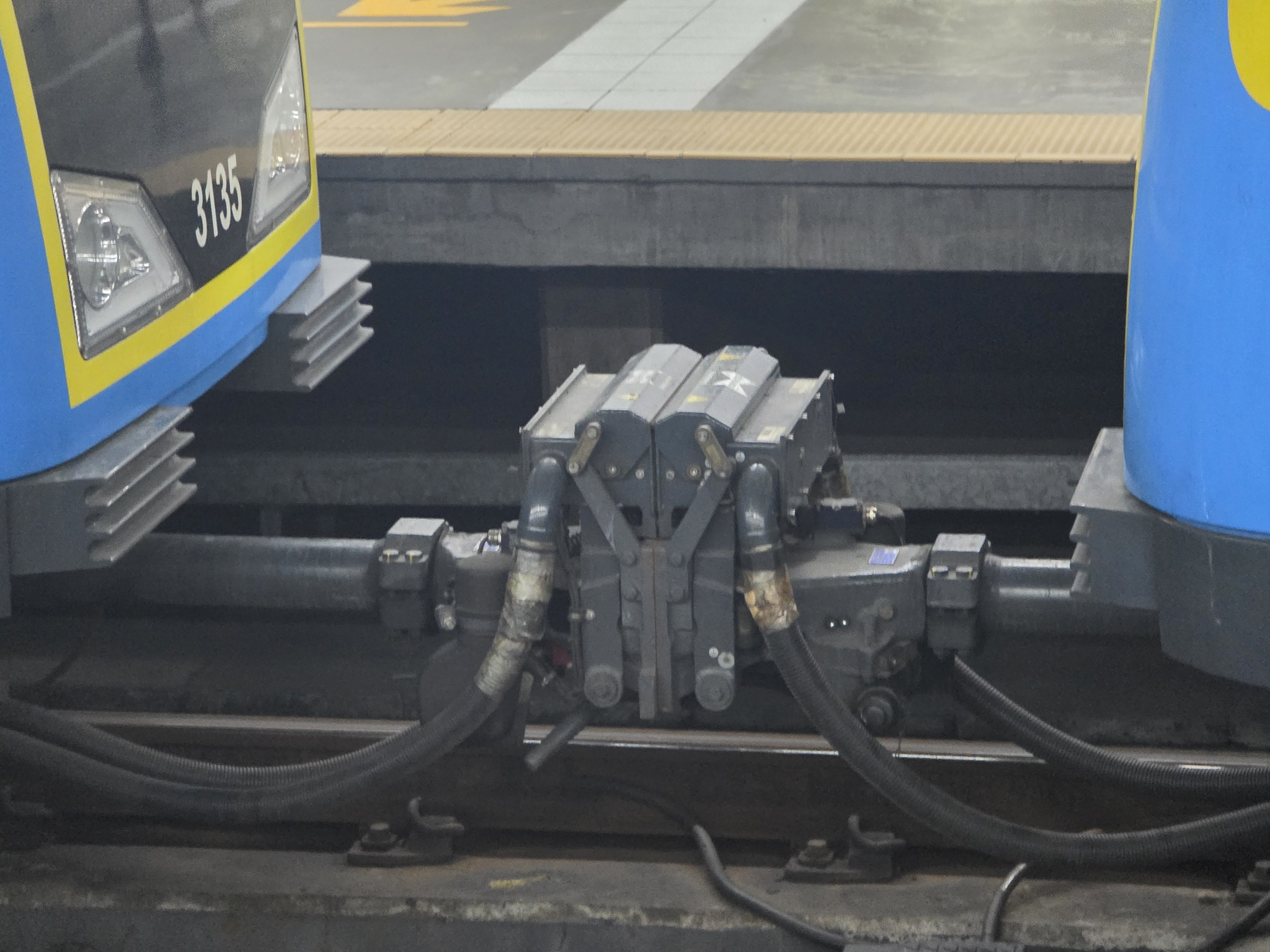
Scharfenberg couplers

=== Electrical ===
Traction is powered through an IGBT–VVVF inverter control manufactured by Voith, and two controllers are installed per vehicle. The traction motor is a three-phase induction motor (totally enclosed/self-ventilated type) manufactured by Traktionssysteme Austria, model TMR 36-28-4, and is combined with Voith quill drive unit. The traction equipment includes two Voith EmCon I1000-9AU traction inverters with 350 kVA continuous power in each that drives the traction motors, one auxiliary converter, and a VPort IO control unit.

The traction motor of the overhauled LRTA 1100 class trains are also manufactured by Voith, and both trains produces identical acceleration sounds.

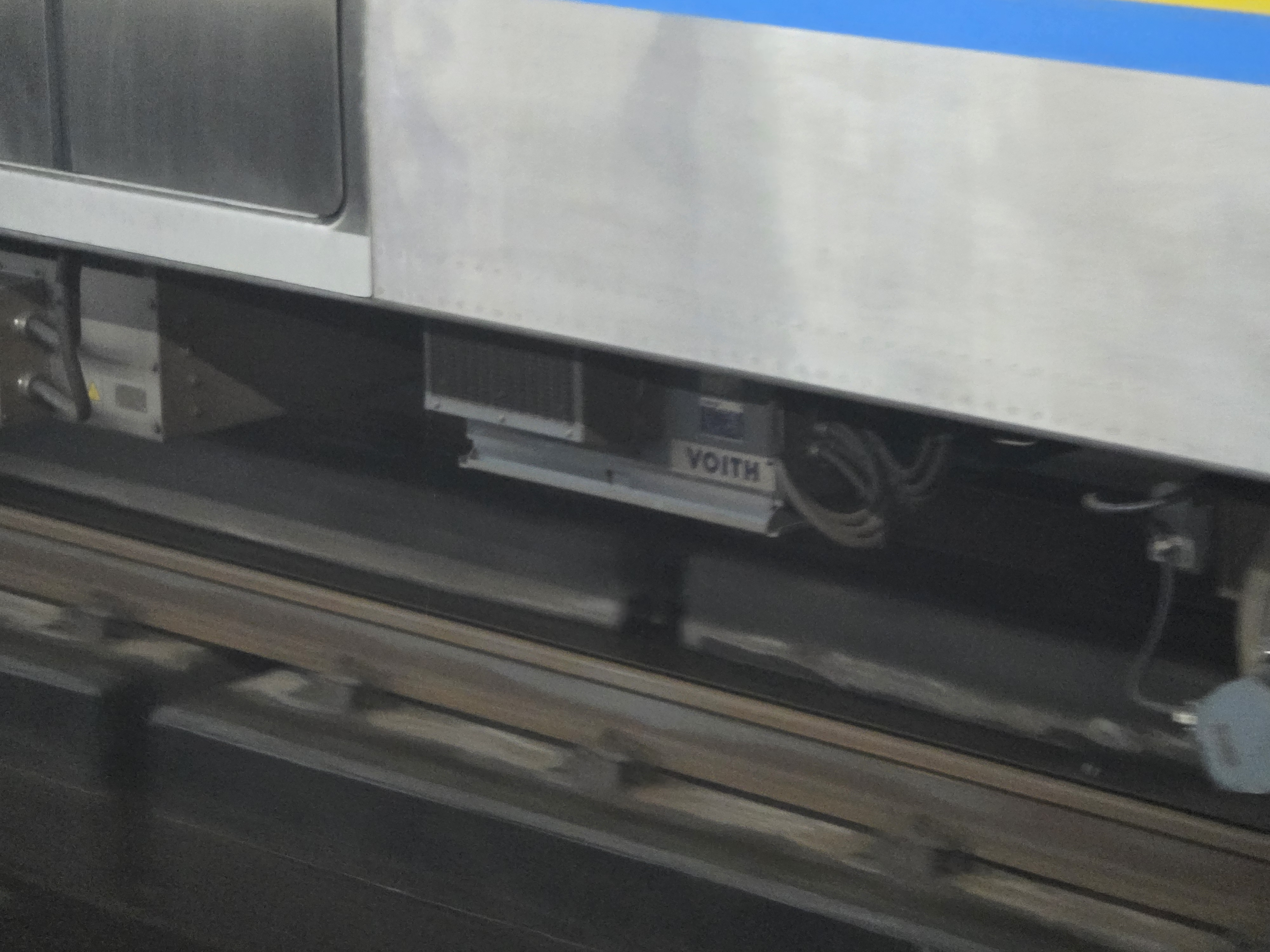
Voith traction inverter

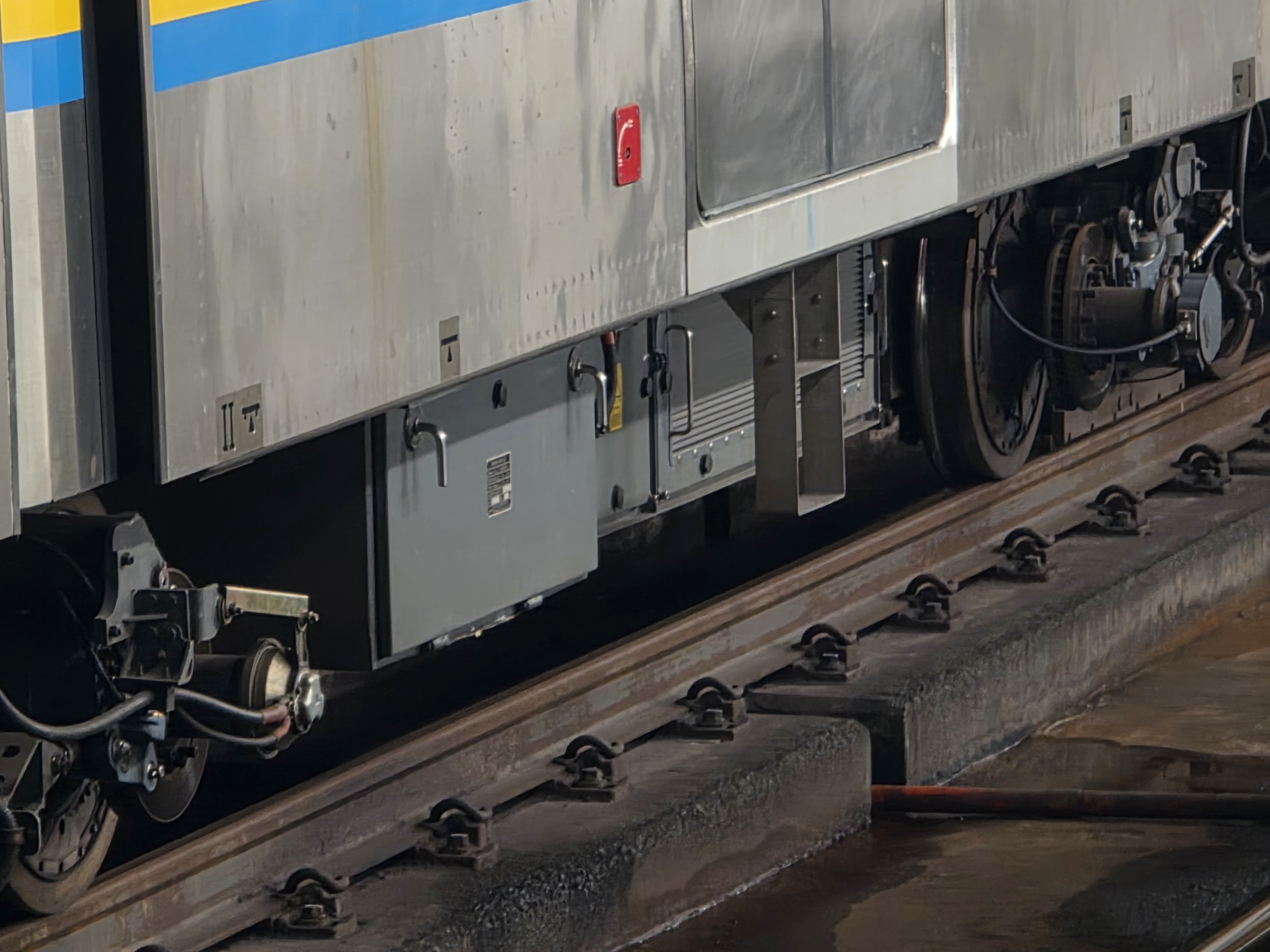
Auxiliary converter

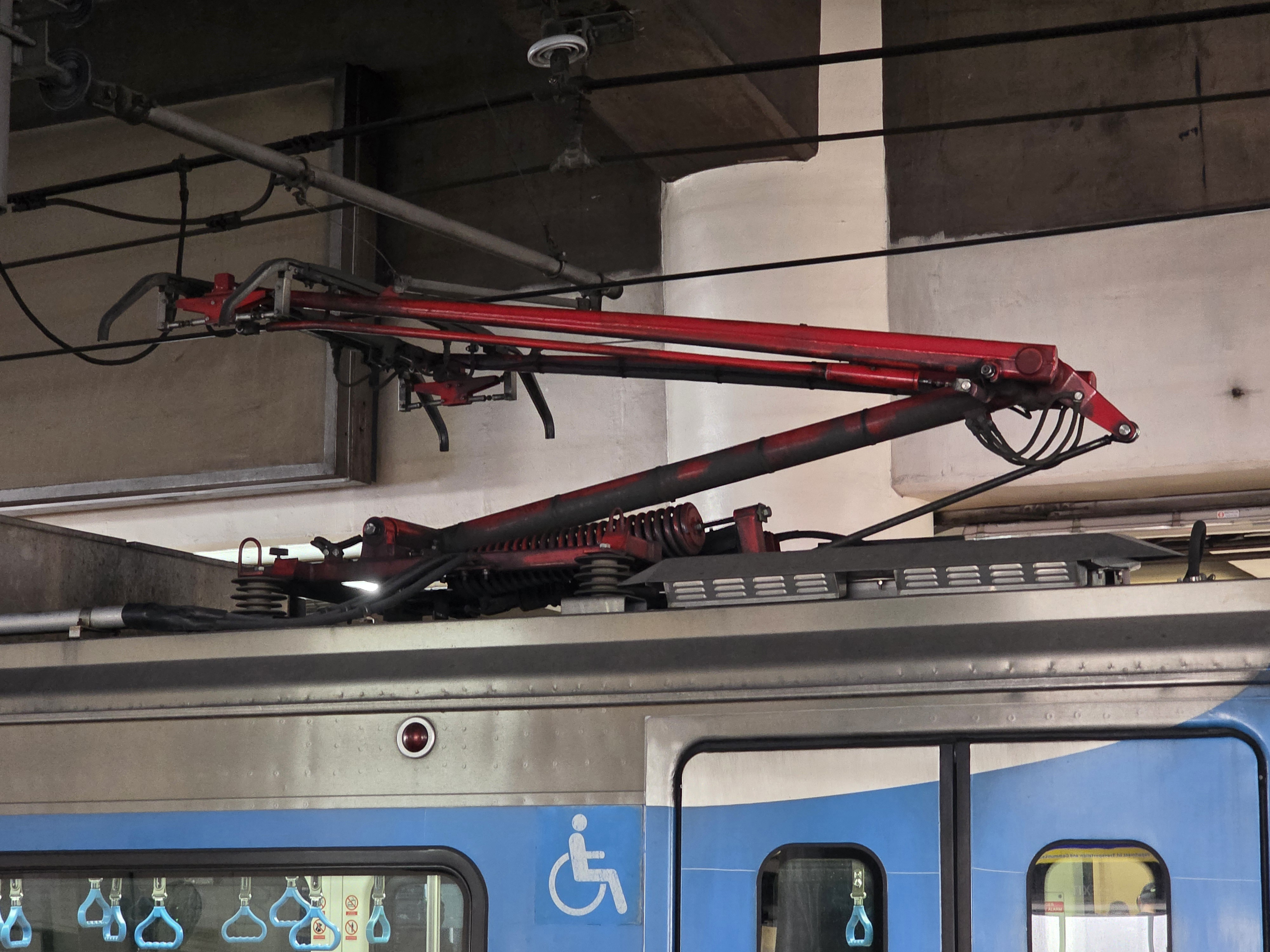
Single-arm pantograph

== Train formation ==
Each unidirectional light rail vehicle consists of three articulated sections.

Cars of 3100 class
Car designation		A-car	B-car	C-car
Control cab		Yes	No	No
Motor		Yes	No	Yes
VVVF inverter		Yes	No	Yes
Auxiliary converter		No	Yes	No
Pantograph		Yes	No	No
Car length	m	31.72		
Car length	ft in	104 ft 13/16 in		
Capacity	Seated	74		
Capacity	Standing	320		
Capacity	Total	394		

== Issues and controversies ==
=== Legal issues ===
Shortly after the contract was awarded, the Metro Rail Transit Corporation (MRTC)—the private owner of the MRT-3—accused the DOTC of violating its build-lease-transfer (BLT) agreement with the MRTC. A Regional Trial Court in Makati issued a temporary restraining order on January 30, halting the acquisition process. Under the BLT agreement, MRTC was assigned the preferential right to purchase new trains, and MRTC can only lose this right if it breaches its obligations under the BLT agreement or consents to the use of trains not provided by MRTC but by the DOTC. In this case, however, DOTC chose to bid out the contract without MRTC's permission.

The court dismissed the case on February 21, citing a law which states that the Supreme Court could only stop infrastructure projects by the national government. MRTC subsequently sent its case to the Court of Appeals (CA), which also sided with the DOTC. MRTC appealed again, resulting in another failure.

On October 14, 2022, the Supreme Court denied MRTC's appeal for injunction to prevent the DOTr from procuring the new trains, thereby permitting their utilization as pursuant to the existing contract.

=== Safety concerns ===
Early on, the DOTC reportedly planned to redo the bidding process while it was reviewing CNR Dalian's capability. According to an unnamed DOTC official who doubted CNR's capability, the firm has no track record of designing and manufacturing light rail vehicles (as its portfolio comprises primarily of locomotives), a claim later backed by the MRTC in January 2016. MRTC, through its chairman Robert Sobrepeña, also claimed that the trains did not undergo a 5,000-kilometer (3,100 mi) test run in China before the shipment to the Philippines.

In 2017, Transportation Undersecretary for Railways Cesar Chavez admitted that the 3100 class trains lacked sufficient signaling equipment, causing a delay in its deployment. By February 2018, only 29 out of 48 trains were installed with on-board automatic train protection (ATP) system equipment. In 2019, Bombardier Transportation certified the onboard signaling systems of the trains. By the end of 2022, only nine out of the 48 light rail vehicles (LRV) were provisionally accepted for regular operations, while the remaining 39 were yet to undergo testing and commissioning.

=== Weight issues ===
The tare weight of the trains exceeded the 46.3-tonne (102,000 lb) requirement by 3.4 tonnes (7,500 lb), weighing 49.7 tonnes (110,000 lb). Senator JV Ejercito, in October 2017, said that the weight of the 8MLB trains exceeded the "tolerance limit" of the tracks.

CRRC Dalian insisted that the trains complied within the specification limits. In a Senate hearing on February 20, 2018, Rolf Bieri, a consultant with former maintenance provider Comm Builders & Technology Philippines (CB&T), said that the trains are within the allowable specifications. Bieri explained that the axle load had to be divided from the projected fully loaded (laden) weight of one LRV at 75.2 tonnes (166,000 lb) by the eight axles, resulting in a 9.4-tonne (21,000 lb) axle load—within the range limit of 8.5 to 10 tonnes (19,000 to 22,000 lb). He further explained that the tracks could not handle anything heavier than the specified limit. TÜV Rheinland later cleared the trains following an audit.

=== Resolution ===
On August 30, 2018, Transportation Secretary Arthur Tugade announced that CRRC Dalian agreed to shoulder all costs to fix the 3100 class trains. Due to the Dalian trains undergoing the said adjustments, they are now slowly being introduced into revenue runs since October 2018.

== Incidents ==
- On December 16, 2020, at 7:20 PM, a 3100 class train arriving at Boni station stopped due to a technical glitch. Around 3,500 commuters were affected as operations were limited between North Avenue and Shaw Boulevard stations. Normal operations resumed the following day.

== See also ==
- MRT Line 3 (Metro Manila)
- Metro Rail Transit Corporation
- MRTC Class 3000
