= 310th =

310th may refer to:

- 310th Air Division, inactive United States Air Force organization
- 310th Air Refueling Squadron, inactive United States Air Force unit
- 310th Airlift Squadron (310 AS), part of the 6th Air Mobility Wing at MacDill Air Force Base, Florida
- 310th Fighter Squadron (310 FS), part of the 56th Operations Group at Luke Air Force Base, Arizona
- 310th Space Wing, United States Air Force unit assigned to the Air Force Reserve Command Tenth Air Force

== See also ==
- 310 (number)
- 310, the year 310 (CCCX) of the Julian calendar
- 310 BC
