= 317th Regiment =

317th Regiment may refer to:

- 317th Armored Cavalry Regiment
- 317th Cavalry Regiment
- 317th Infantry Regiment
