= 318th Cavalry Regiment =

Former unit of the US Army

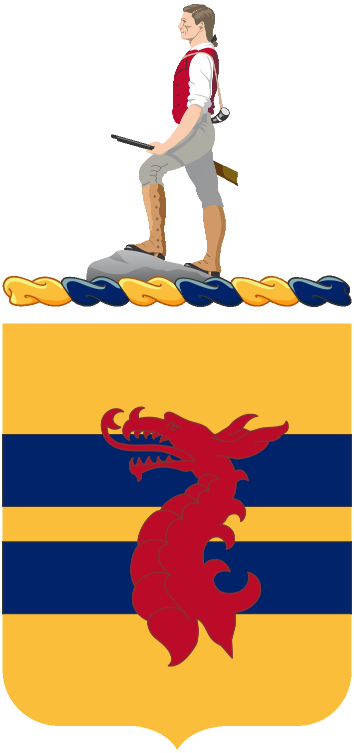
- Coat of Arms of the 318th Cavalry Regiment
- Active: 1922–1942
- Country: United States
- Branch: United States Army
- Type: Cavalry
- Part of: 65th Cavalry Division (1921–1942)
- Garrison/HQ: Chicago (1937–1941)
- Mottos: "Fide Et Animis" (By Faith and Courage)

Insignia
- Distinctive Trimming

The 318th Cavalry Regiment was a cavalry unit of the United States Army during the interwar period. The unit was activated as an Illinois Organized Reserve unit during the interwar period. It was converted into a signal aircraft warning regiment after the United States entered World War II.

== History ==
The regiment was constituted on 15 October 1921 in the Organized Reserves, part of the 65th Cavalry Division's 159th Cavalry Brigade in the Sixth Corps Area. It was initiated (activated) on 6 June 1922 with the entire regiment in Chicago. The regimental band was initiated in 1923 at Chicago. On 2 June 1925, the 318th's headquarters relocated to La Grange, the 1st Squadron to Hinsdale, and the 2nd Squadron to Elgin. In July 1929, a new 3rd Squadron was initiated at Chicago. On 27 September 1932, the 1st Squadron was moved to Lemont, the 2nd Squadron to Oak Park, and the 3rd Squadron to Aurora. In 1935, the regiment participated in a 33rd Division staff exercise at Camp Grant, which was planned and supervised by Colonel George C. Marshall, then the senior instructor to the Illinois National Guard. The entire regiment moved back to Chicago on 28 July 1937.

The 318th usually held its inactive training period meetings at Chicago's Post Office Building. It conducted regular equestrian training at Fort Sheridan on the horses of the 1st Squadron, 14th Cavalry Regiment, and in Chicago on the horses of the 106th Cavalry Regiment. The regiment conducted summer training at Fort Sheridan with the 14th Cavalry and some years at Fort Des Moines. As an alternate form of training, the 318th provided cavalry training to civilians at Fort Sheridan under the Citizens' Military Training Camp program. Its primary ROTC feeder school was the University of Illinois and its designated mobilization training station was Camp Grant. After the United States entered World War II, the regiment was converted into the 546th Signal Aircraft Warning Regiment on 30 January 1942. The regiment was disbanded on 11 November 1944.

== Commanders ==
The 318th was commanded by the following officers:

- Colonel Harvey L. Jones (6 June 1922 – 1 August 1925)
- Lieutenant Colonel Charles Powers (1 August 1925 – 12 May 1926)
- Lieutenant Colonel William A. Peterson (12 May 1926 – July 1940)

== Heraldry ==
The regimental distinctive trimming was approved on 1 April 1924 and its coat of arms was approved on 30 March 1932. The distinctive trimming was a vertical representation of the original Flag of Chicago, where the unit was based. The coat of arms consisted of a yellow shield with two blue bars in the center. A red dragon was superimposed over the bars. The shield's color represented the Cavalry, the bars were from the Flag of Chicago, and the dragon symbolized great bravery and mobility, traits that a Cavalry unit was supposed to exemplify. The coat of arms included the Organized Reserve's Minuteman crest above the shield. The regimental motto was "Fide Et Animis" (By Faith and Courage).
