= Municipal device of Chicago =

Symbol of Chicago

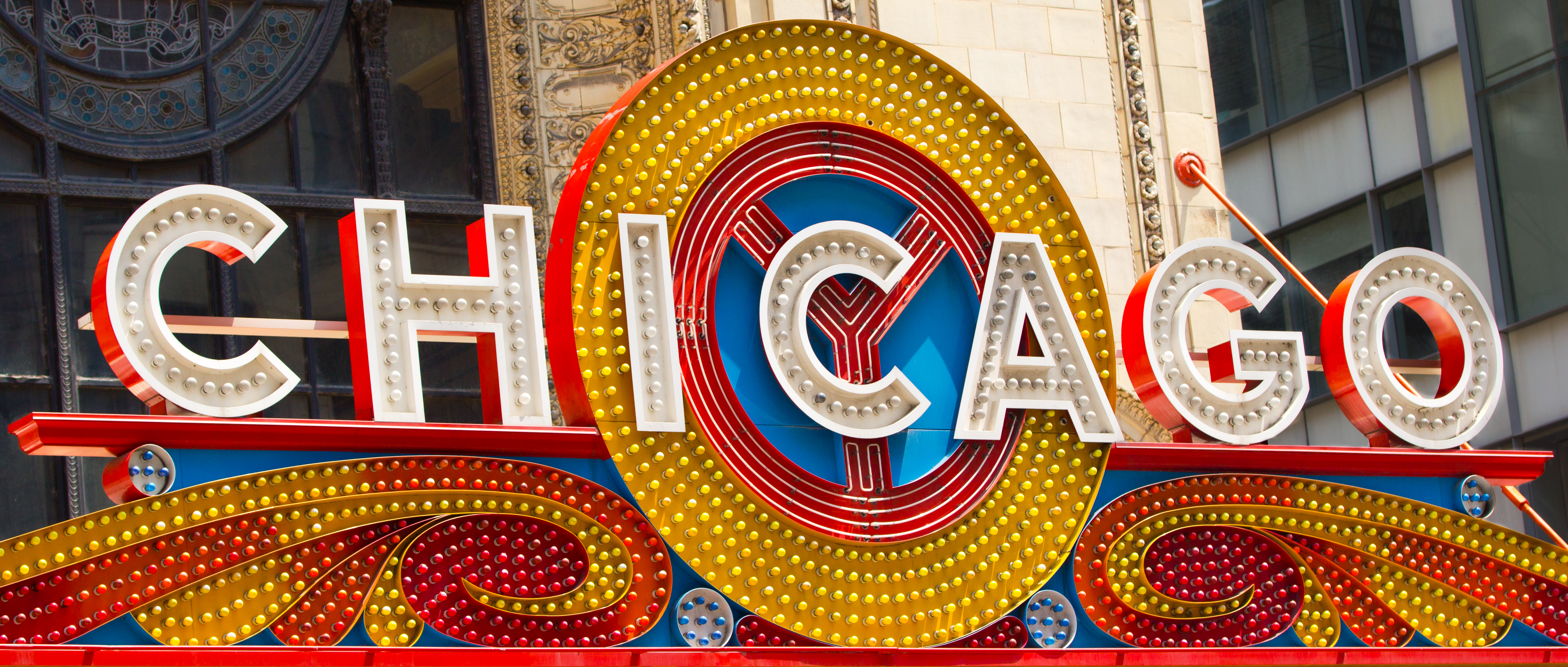
The municipal device of Chicago as it appears in the background of the marquee of the Chicago Theatre.

A Y-shaped symbol is also featured on the revised Cook County Flag, adopted September 22, 2022.

The municipal device of Chicago is a symbol used officially by the city of Chicago, Illinois, as well as unofficially by various agencies and companies associated with the city. As defined by city code, it consists of a Y shape inscribed inside of a circle. The symbol represents the north, south, and main branches of the Chicago River, and their confluence at Wolf Point. It was designed by Danish-born architect and civil engineer Alfred J. Råvad (Roewad). Its earliest known appearance was in 1892 for a contest to design the city's flag held by the Chicago Tribune. While this was ultimately not used for the flag, in 1917 it was officially adopted along with the flag and seal as symbols of the city of Chicago.

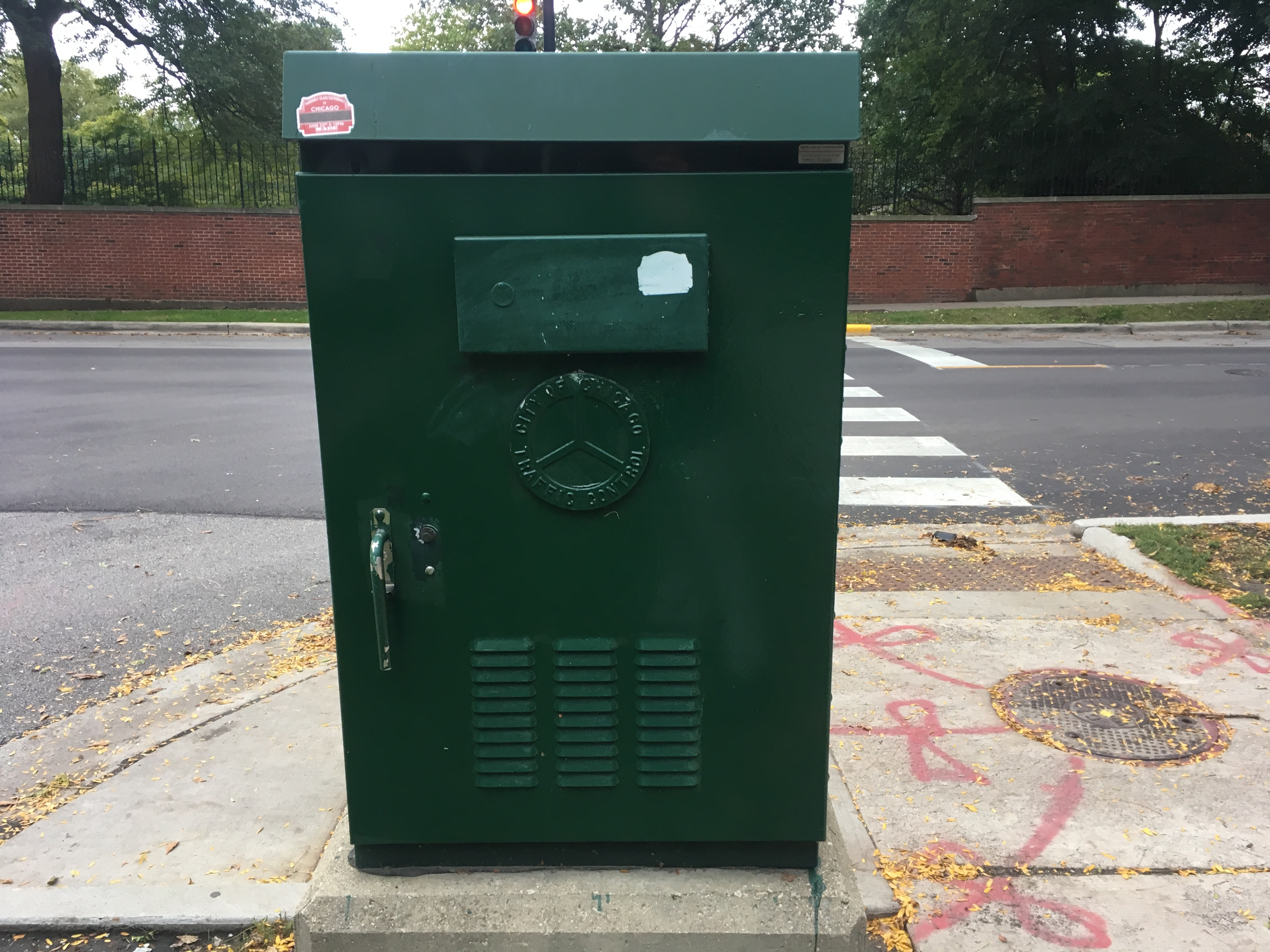
The municipal device appearing on a traffic control box in the city. Note that the device is used upside-down.

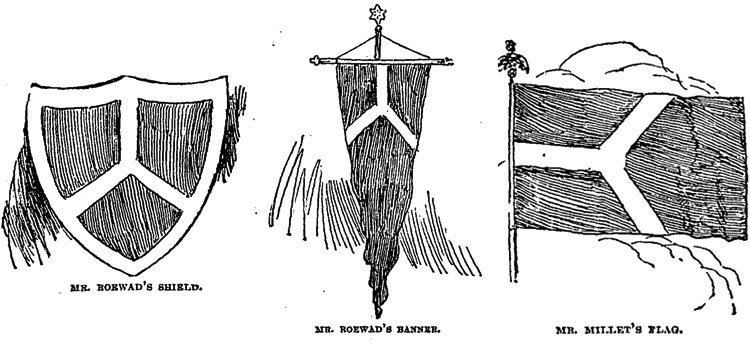
Sketches for the Chicago flag for a contest held by the Chicago Tribune in 1892. The Y-shaped mark ultimately became used for the municipal device in 1917.

Flag proposed by Francis Davis Millet in 1892, based on Alfred Jensen Råvad's winning design for the Chicago Tribune contest. Despite never being approved by the city council, it became widely used as an unofficial city flag during the World's Columbian Exposition (1893) in particular. It was ultimately superseded by Chicago's first official flag in 1917.

Burgee of the Chicago Corinthian Yacht Club.

The municipal device was widely used in the early twentieth century on civic vehicles and buildings but fell out of favor in the latter half of the century. The exact reasons for its decreased use are unknown, but was possibly motivated by concerns it would be confused with the peace sign, especially as some agencies purposefully flipped the device to celebrate the reversal of the Chicago River. In addition, as affordable vinyl printing made detailed signage more accessible, the device lost popularity on city vehicles in favor of printing the full seal. It is still used prominently in the seal of the Chicago Public Library and can be found on buildings throughout the city such as the Chicago Theatre.
