= 65th Cavalry Division =

- Shoulder Sleeve Insignia of the 65th Cavalry Division
- Active: 1921–1942
- Country: United States of America
- Branch: United States Army
- Type: Cavalry
- Size: Division
- Part of: Sixth Corps Area
- Garrison/HQ: Chicago
- Nickname: Chevaliers

The 65th Cavalry Division was a cavalry division of the United States Army Organized Reserve. It was created due to the perceived need for additional cavalry units in the interwar period. It was numbered in succession of the Regular Army cavalry divisions, not all of which were active at its creation. The 65th Cavalry Division was organized in the Midwestern United States, being composed of Reserve personnel living in Illinois, Michigan and Wisconsin.

== History ==
The 65th Cavalry Division was constituted in the Organized Reserve on 15 October 1921, allotted to the Sixth Corps Area, and assigned to the Sixth Army. The division headquarters was initiated on 11 February 1922 at 405 West Van Buren Street in Chicago, Illinois, by Major William C. Christy. The headquarters was relocated on 12 June 1930 to the Bilandic Building, 160 North La Salle Street, in Chicago. The tables of organization in the division remained unchanged until 1 July 1929 when the machine gun squadrons were eliminated and their personnel were absorbed into other units. Other changes to the division organization were the addition of the 465th Armored Car Squadron, 465th Tank Company (Light), and the expansion of the 465th Field Artillery Battalion into a regiment (and concurrent redesignation as the 865th). Additionally, when the field armies were activated and army areas reallocated in 1933, the division was relieved from the Sixth Army and assigned to the Fourth Army.

The Inactive Training Period for the “Chevaliers” usually ran from September to May, and many of the units held their training meetings at National Guard armories in the cities where they were located. The 317th and 318th Cavalry, for example, frequently conducted training with the horses and equipment from the “Black Horse Troop” of the 106th Cavalry in Chicago. The 319th Cavalry often trained with the Michigan elements of the 106th Cavalry in Detroit, as did the 160th Machine Gun Squadron. The 320th Cavalry trained with troops of the 105th Cavalry, Wisconsin National Guard. The division's units held their summer training camps primarily at Camp Custer, Michigan; Fort Des Moines, Iowa; and Fort Sheridan, Illinois. In the case of most of the division's units, the 1st Squadron, 14th Cavalry, at Fort Sheridan usually provided support in terms of horses, equipment, and training expertise for their summer training, whether it was at Fort Sheridan or Camp Custer. For more than a few summers, the 159th Cavalry Brigade was sent to Fort Des Moines to conduct training with the 14th Cavalry (-). During those years, the cavalry regiments of the 159th also conducted the training of the cavalry elements of the Citizens' Military Training Camps (CMTC) at Fort Des Moines. The division also staged cavalry exhibitions in Chicago to gain interest in the CMTC summer camps. The 159th alternated the responsibilities of CMTC training each year with the regiments of the 66th Cavalry Division. The division's support units established training affiliations with Regular Army units as well and generally went to other camps designed for their respective arm or service. For example, the 405th Engineer Squadron usually trained at Fort Sheridan and Camp Custer; the 465th Field Artillery Battalion trained with the units of the 1st Battalion, 14th Field Artillery, and later the 3rd Field Artillery, both at Fort Sheridan; and the 465th Armored Car Squadron trained with the 14th Cavalry at Fort Sheridan. Additionally, the 365th Medical Squadron trained at the medical officers' training camp at Fort Snelling, Minnesota.

During the 1930s, the level of training accelerated and became more varied as experience levels increased in the staff officers of the headquarters, as well as those in subordinate units. Throughout the 1930s, the units and staffs of the 65th Cavalry Division participated in various army and corps area command post exercises (CPXs). The training objective of these CPXs was to prepare the staffs of the Regular Army, National Guard, and Organized Reserve units for the 1936 Second Army maneuvers. The first of these major exercises was the Sixth Corps Area CPX held at Camp Custer in May 1932. Three years later, the 318th Cavalry participated in a staff exercise with the Illinois National Guard's 33rd Division at Camp Grant. The exercise was planned and supervised by Colonel George C. Marshall, the senior instructor to the Illinois National Guard at the time. This was followed by a 65th Cavalry Division CPX during April 1936 in Chicago and finally by the Second Army maneuver in August 1936. Due to the lack of horses, equipment, and enlisted men, the division did not participate in the Second Army maneuvers as an organized unit. Instead, the members of the division reinforced Regular or Guard units to bring them up to wartime strength in officers or by acting as umpires. In general, elements of the division reinforced the 14th Cavalry and the 53rd Cavalry Brigade, which participated in the Sixth Corps Area portion of the maneuvers held at Camp Custer. In all, over 200 officers from the division participated. The next event in the life of the division was the Second Army maneuvers held in central Wisconsin in August 1940. This time, the officers of the 65th Cavalry Division reinforced the 1st Squadron, 14th Cavalry, but also provided a substantial number of officers to the 33rd Division as well. The 1940 Second Army maneuvers was the division's last major training event. Over the next year, most of the division's assigned personnel were called to active duty during the buildup of the U.S. Army in 1940–41, and assigned to Regular Army and National Guard units, and the 65th essentially ceased to exist as an organized unit. The division headquarters was disbanded on 30 January 1942.

== Organization ==
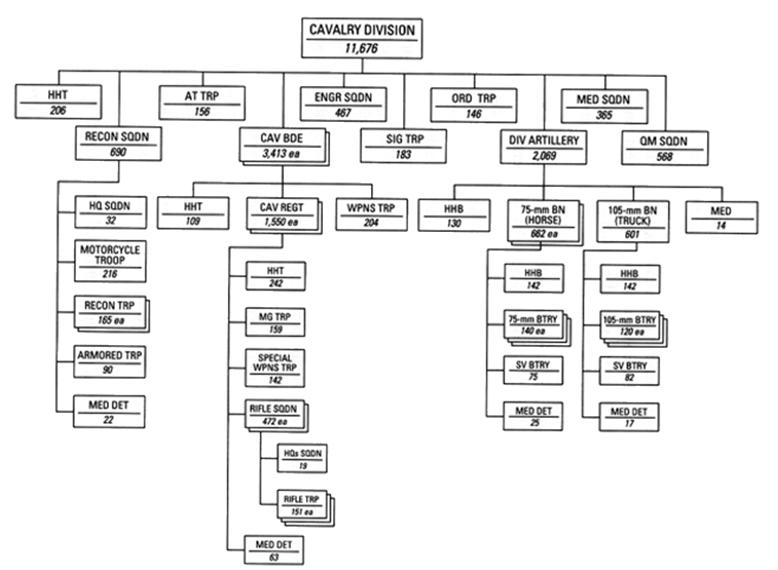
Standard organization chart for a Cavalry Division in November 1940

In 1940, the division included the following units:

- Headquarters (Chicago)
- Headquarters, Special Troops (Chicago)
  - Headquarters Troop (Chicago)
  - 65th Signal Troop (Chicago)
  - 585th Ordnance Company (Medium) (Chicago)
  - 465th Tank Company (Light) (Chicago)
- 159th Cavalry Brigade (Chicago)
  - 317th Cavalry Regiment (Chicago)
  - 318th Cavalry Regiment (La Grange)
- 160th Cavalry Brigade (Detroit)
  - 319th Cavalry Regiment (Detroit)
  - 320th Cavalry Regiment (Milwaukee)
- 865th Field Artillery Regiment (Chicago)
- 465th Reconnaissance Squadron - Mechanized (Detroit)
- 465th Quartermaster Squadron (Chicago)
- 405th Engineer Squadron (Chicago)
- 365th Medical Squadron (Chicago)

== Chiefs of Staff ==
- Maj. William C. Christy (11 February 1922–4 June 1922)
- Lt. Col. Charles O. Thomas Jr. (4 June 1922–8 September 1924)
- Col. John G. Winter (8 September 1924–13 June 1925)
- Col. Alvin C. Gillem (13 June 1925–December 1927)
- Lt. Col. William A. Cornell (December 1927–26 May 1928)
- Col. George T. Langhorne (26 May 1928–31 July 1931)
- Col. Edward Davis (1 August 1931–10 June 1936)
- Col. Robert C. Rodgers (10 June 1936–3 January 1938)
- Col. Edward Davis (3 January 1938–5 February 1940)
- Lt. Col. James A. Kilian (5 February 1940–30 January 1942)
