= 317th Cavalry Regiment =

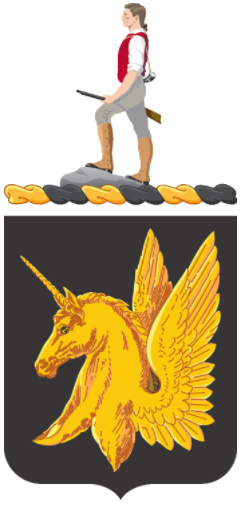
- Coat of Arms of the 317th Cavalry Regiment
- Active: 1922–1943
- Country: United States
- Branch: United States Army
- Type: Cavalry
- Part of: 65th Cavalry Division (1921–1942)
- Garrison/HQ: Chicago
- Mottos: "Audax Et Vigilans" (Daring and Vigilant)

Insignia
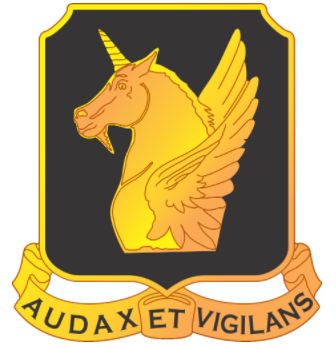
- Distinctive Unit Insignia

The 317th Cavalry Regiment was a cavalry unit of the United States Army during the interwar period. The unit was activated as an Illinois Organized Reserve unit during the interwar period. It was disbanded after the United States entered World War II.

== History ==
The regiment was constituted on 15 October 1921 in the Organized Reserves, part of the 65th Cavalry Division's 159th Cavalry Brigade in the Sixth Corps Area. It was initiated (activated) on 8 August 1922 with all units in Chicago. In June 1926 and 1927, it sponsored the Military Tournament at Soldier Field. On 1 July 1929, a new 3rd Squadron was activated in Chicago. The regiment usually held its inactive training period meetings at Chicago's Post Office Building. It conducted regular equestrian training at Fort Sheridan on the horses of the 1st Squadron, 14th Cavalry Regiment. The 317th conducted summer training at Fort Sheridan with the 14th Cavalry and at Fort Des Moines in some years. Its primary feeder school for the Reserve Officers' Training Corps was the University of Illinois, and its designated mobilization training station was Camp Grant. It was disbanded on 18 October 1943 after the United States entered World War II and its assigned personnel were called up for active duty. An unrelated 317th Armored Cavalry Regiment briefly existed postwar as an Illinois reserve unit.

== Commanders ==
The 317th was commanded by the following officers:

- Major Ira G. Holcomb (8 August 1922 – 5 January 1923)
- Colonel Tryggve A. Siqueland (6 January 1923 – 7 February 1937)
- Lieutenant Colonel Lawrence M. Graham (8 February 1937–March 1941)

== Heraldry ==
The regiment's coat of arms was approved on 21 March 1924 and its distinctive unit insignia was approved on 20 December. Both were rescinded on 10 February 1959. The distinctive unit insignia was a 1 1/8 inches (2.9 cm) gold colored metal and enamel device. It included a black shield depicting the golden head and wings of a unicorn. The regimental motto, "Audax Et Vigilans" (Daring and Vigilant), was attached on a scroll to the bottom of the insignia. The unicorn symbolized continued loyalty to duty and obligation and faithfulness to the service and the country. Its coat of arms was similar to the distinctive unit insignia except that it added the Minuteman crest of the Organized Reserve and omitted the motto.
