= Flag of Chicago =

City of Chicago
- Use: Civil flag
- Proportion: 2:3
- Adopted: Original, 28 March 1917; additional stars added, 1933 and 21 December 1939.
- Design: Argent four mullets of six points gules in fess between two bars bleu de ciel.
- Designed by: Wallace Rice

The flag of Chicago consists of two light blue horizontal bars, or stripes, on a field of white, each bar one-sixth the height of the full flag, and placed slightly less than one-sixth of the way from the top and bottom. Four bright red stars, with six sharp points each, are set side by side, close together, in the middle third of the flag's surface.

== Symbolism ==
=== Bars ===
The three white background areas of the flag represent, from top to bottom, the North, West, and South sides of the city. The top blue bar represents Lake Michigan and the North Branch of the Chicago River. The bottom blue bar represents the South Branch of the river and the "Great Canal", over the Chicago Portage. The light blue of the flag's two bars is variously called sky blue or pale blue; in a 1917 article of a speech by designer Wallace Rice, it was called "the color of water".

=== Stars ===
Infographic displaying the history and meaning of the Chicago flag.

There are four red six-pointed stars on the center white bar. Six-pointed stars are used because five-pointed stars supposedly represented sovereign states and because the star as designed was found on no other known flags as of 1917. From the hoist outwards, the stars represent:

- Original to the 1917 flag: This star stands for the Great Chicago Fire of 1871. Its six points symbolize transportation, labor, commerce, finance, populousness, and salubrity (health).
- Original to the 1917 flag: This star symbolizes the World's Columbian Exposition of 1893. Its six points represent the virtues of religion, education, aesthetics, justice, beneficence, and civic pride.
- Added in 1933: This star represents the Century of Progress Exposition (1933–34). Its points refer to: Chicago's status as the United States' second largest city at the time of the star's addition (Chicago became third largest in a 1990 census when passed by Los Angeles); Chicago's Latin motto, Urbs in horto ("City in a garden"); Chicago's "I Will" motto; the Great Central Marketplace; Wonder City; and Convention City.
- Added in 1939: Commemorates Fort Dearborn, and its six points stand for political entities the Chicago region has belonged to and the flags that have flown over the area: France, 1693; Great Britain, 1763; Virginia, 1778; the Northwest Territory, 1789; Indiana Territory, 1802; and Illinois (territory, 1809, and state, since 1818).

Additional stars have been proposed, with varying degrees of seriousness. The following reasons have been suggested for possible additions of a fifth star:

==== Fifth Star ====
Hypothetical version of the Chicago flag with a fifth star added

- A fifth star could represent Chicago's contribution to the nuclear age (see Metallurgical Laboratory), an idea first suggested in a 1940s letter published by the Chicago Tribune and later championed by Mayor Richard J. Daley in the 1960s.
- In the 1980s, a star was proposed in honor of Harold Washington, the first African-American mayor of Chicago.
- When Chicago was bidding to host the 2016 Summer Olympics, the Bid Committee proposed that a fifth star be added to the flag in commemoration, but the bid was won instead by Rio de Janeiro, Brazil.
- Anne Burke, Tim Shriver, and others have proposed adding a fifth star to commemorate the Special Olympics, which were founded in Chicago.
- Other sports-related suggestions include recognizing the Chicago Bulls' dominance of the National Basketball Association in the 1990s and a proposal for a fifth star if the Chicago Cubs should ever win the World Series, which did not happen between their long drought of series wins in 1908, up to 2016.
- The Chicago History Museum has an ongoing exhibition where the public is encouraged to vote for a potential fifth star.
- Former Mayor of Chicago Lori Lightfoot suggested that Chicago's response to the COVID-19 pandemic could warrant adding a fifth star to Chicago's flag.

== Unlawful private use ==
Per the Municipal Code of Chicago, it is unlawful to use the flag, or any imitation or design thereof, except for the usual and customary purposes of decoration or display. Causing to be displayed on the flag, any letter, word, legend, or device not provided for in the Code is also prohibited. Violators are subject to fines between $5.00 and $25.00 for each offense. However, the United States Constitution, via its first and fourteenth amendments, prohibits this section from being enforced (Street v. New York).

== History ==
=== Chicago Tribune contest ===
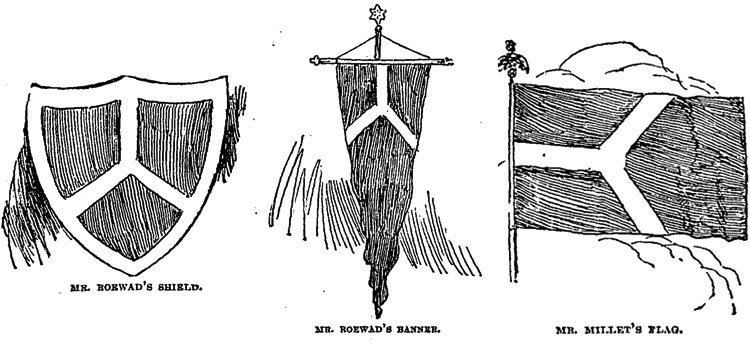
Alfred Råvad's sketches for the flag from a contest from 1892.

Unofficial flag until 1917

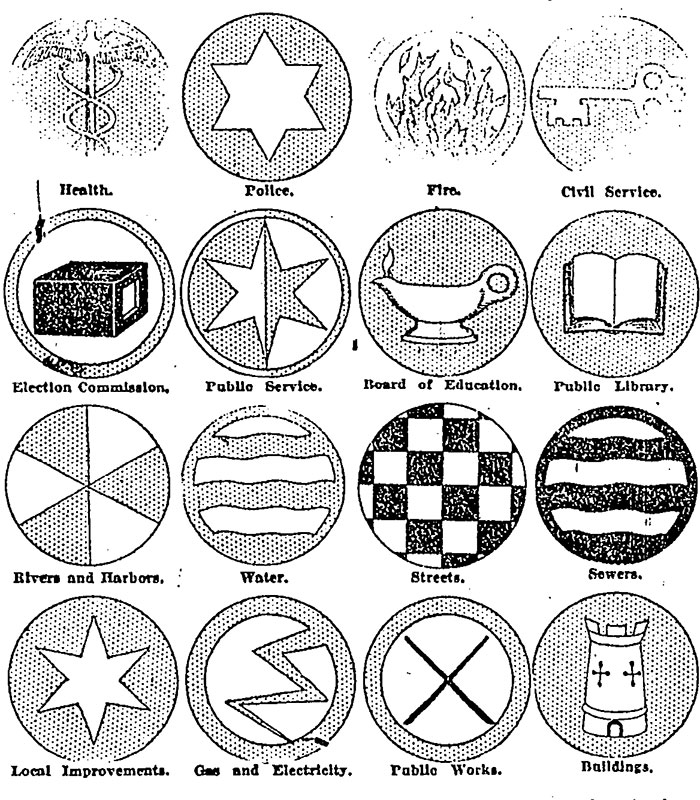
Twenty-three other icons that were commissioned representing different city departments could be placed on the flag for that department.

The issue of the city flag came into focus during the preparations for the Chicago World's Fair. In 1892, the Chicago Tribune offered a one-hundred-dollar prize for the best suggestion of a municipal color or combination of colors that would symbolize the city. 829 projects were submitted to the competition and the winner was a Danish architect who'd recently moved to Chicago, to design buildings for the World's Fair, Alfred Råvad (who also used an Americanized spelling of his name, Roewad). Råvada's design proposed red and white as the city's colors and a symbol in the shape of a horizontal letter "Y", representing the Chicago River, whose branches create this branching pattern. The Råvada design became only an unofficial flag and was never confirmed by any relevant resolution, but ultimately became used in the municipal device.

=== Wallace Rice's design ===
1917–1933

Mayor William Hale Thompson's proposed flag, 1928

1933–1939

Distinctive Unit Insignia of the 318th Cavalry Regiment, a reserve force created in the 1920s

In 1915, Mayor William Hale Thompson appointed a municipal flag commission chaired by Alderman James A. Kearns. Among the commission members were wealthy industrialist Charles Deering and impressionist painter Lawton S. Parker. Parker asked lecturer and poet Wallace Rice to develop the rules for an open public competition for the best flag design. Over a thousand entries were received.

The flag was adopted in 1917 after the design by Wallace Rice won a City Council sponsored competition. It initially had two stars until 1933, when a third was added. The four-star version has existed since 1939. The three sections of the white field and the two bars represent geographical features of the city, the stars symbolize historical events, and the points of the stars represent important virtues or concepts. The historic events represented by the stars are the establishment of Fort Dearborn, the Great Chicago Fire of 1871, the World's Columbian Exposition of 1893, and Century of Progress Exposition of 1933–34.

In 1928, Mayor William Hale Thompson proposed that the stars on Chicago's flag should be changed from six-pointed to five-pointed, as he felt five-pointed stars were more "American". Although the change was unanimously approved by City Council on February 15, 1928, the description of the new design never made it into the city's ordinance books. When the Council voted to add the third star to Chicago's flag in 1933, the vote ended any uncertainty on the shape of the stars by reconfirming them as six-pointed.

The 318th Cavalry Regiment incorporated the flag into their insignia.

In a 2004 review by the North American Vexillological Association of 150 American city flags, the Chicago city flag was ranked second-best with a rating of 9.03 out of 10, behind only the flag of Washington, D.C.

== Gallery ==
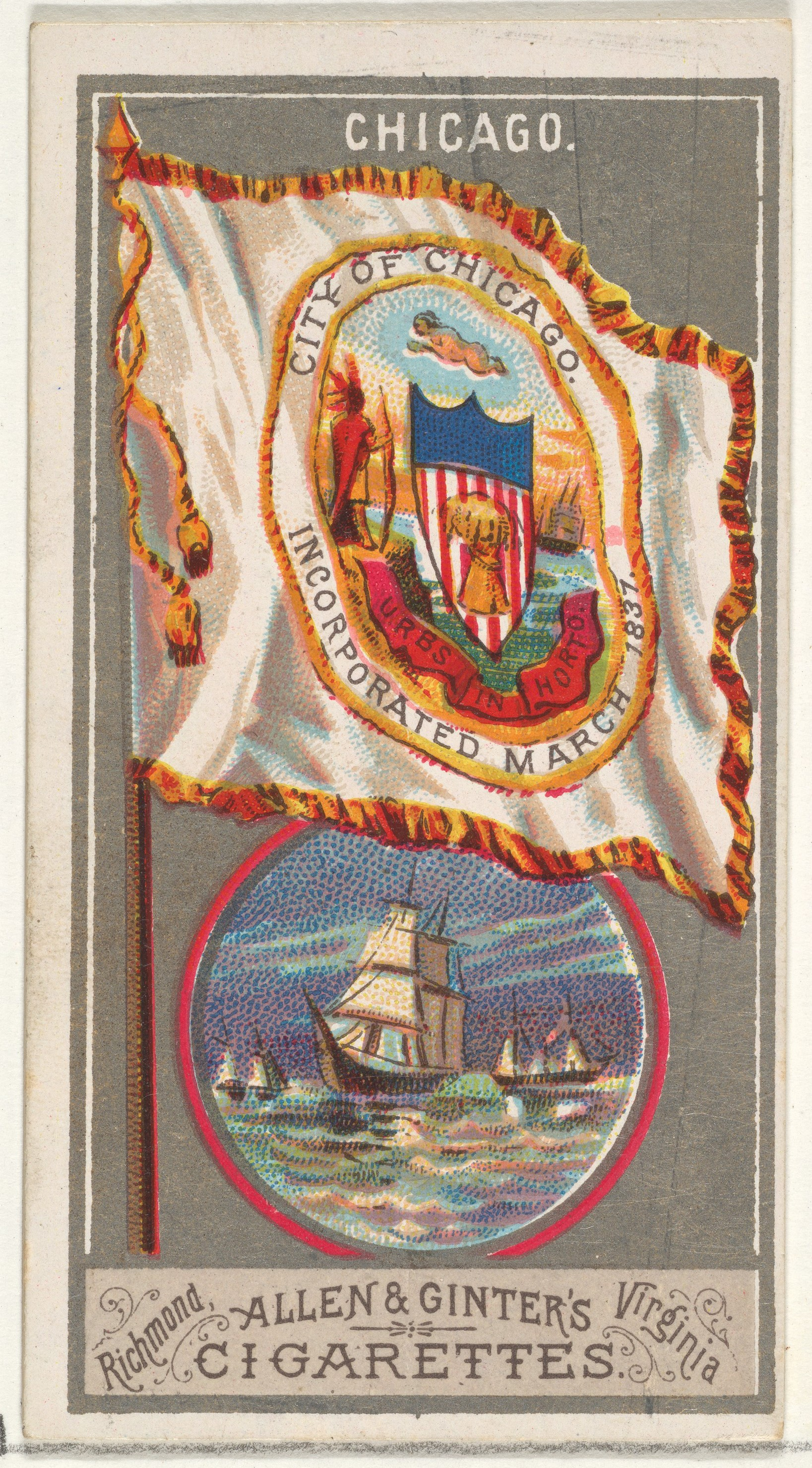
Allen & Ginter cigarette card with a drawing of a false flag, issued at a time when the city had no flag.

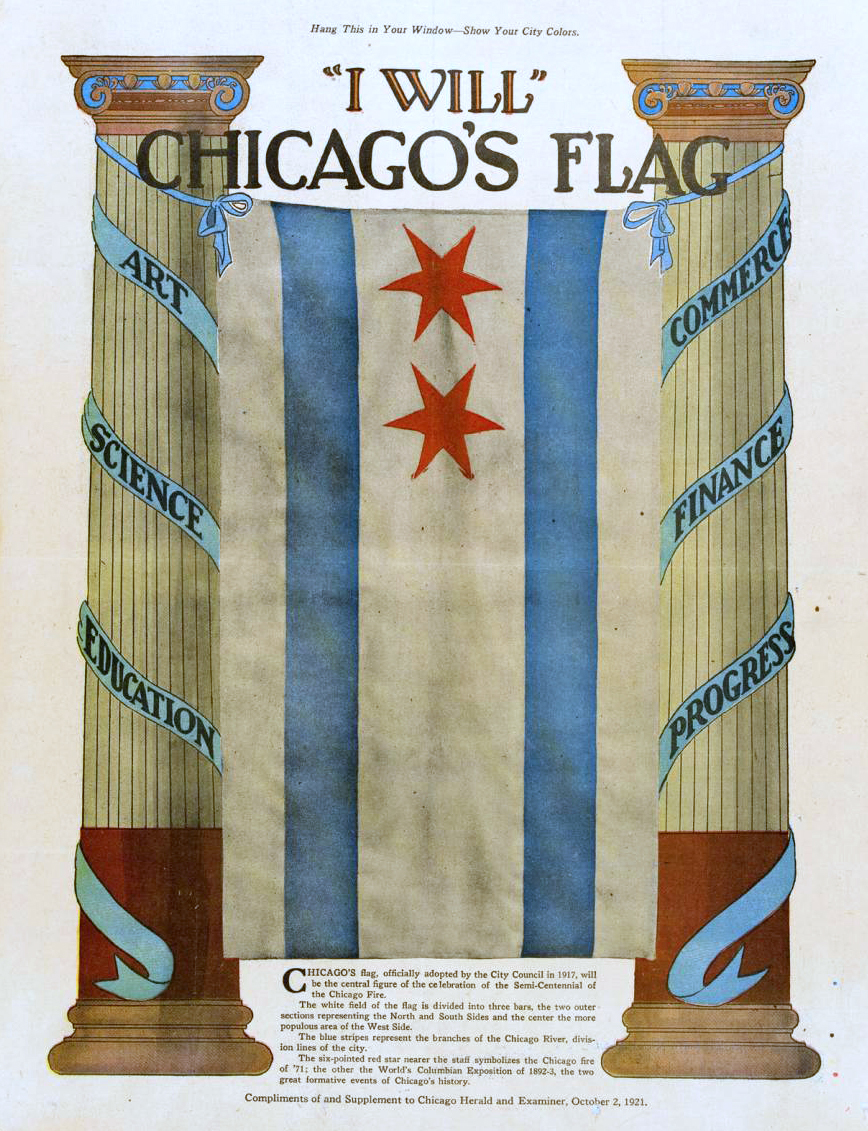
Chicago flag of 1917 poster, with "I Will" motto.

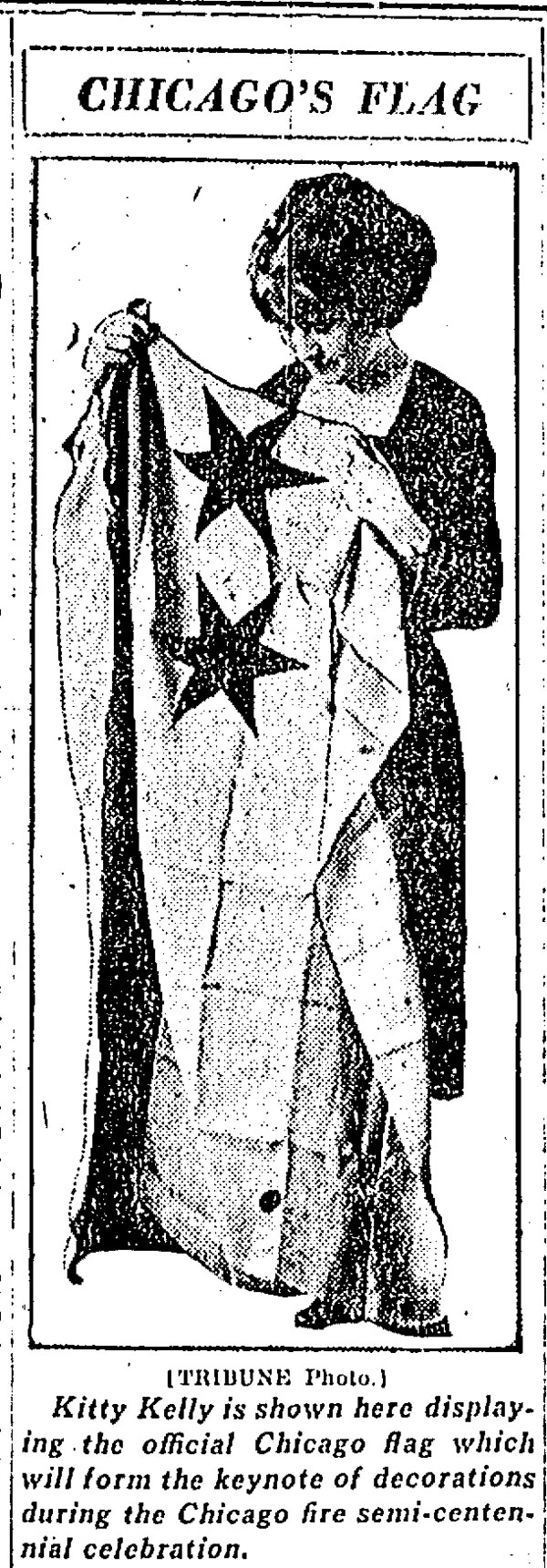
Kitty Kelly holding Flag of Chicago from the Chicago Tribune, 1921. Note the two stars on the flag at the time.

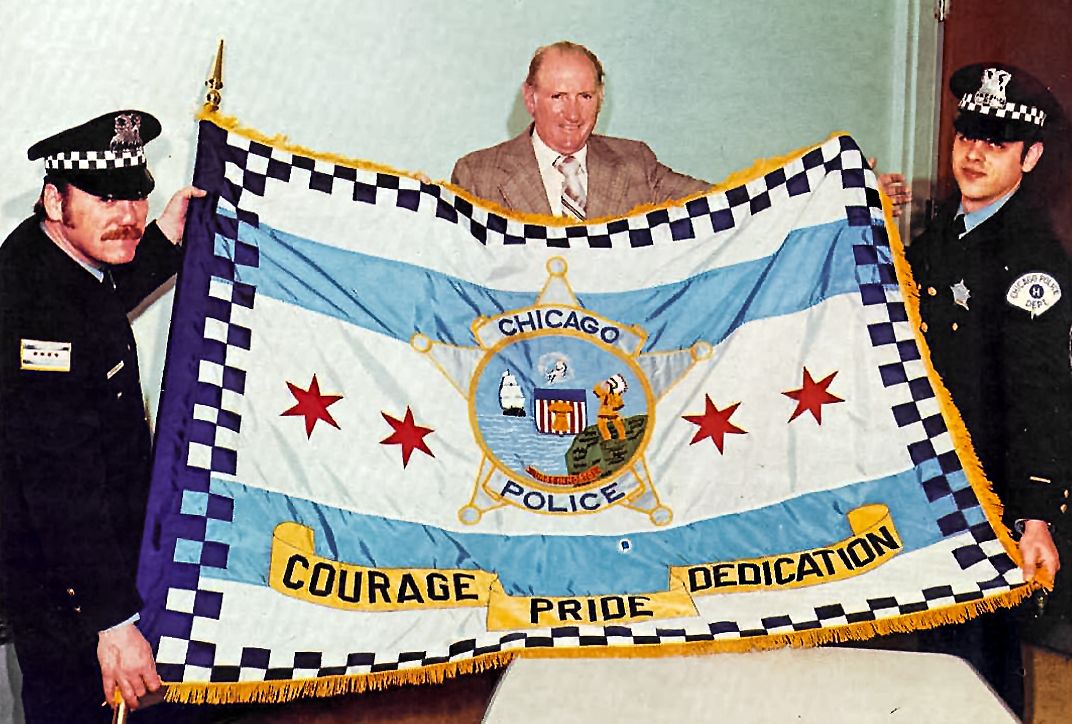
Unveiling of the flag of the Chicago Police Department, c. 1977

Flag of Alliance Française de Chicago students

Burgee of the Chicago Corinthian Yacht Club

== See also ==
- Flag of Cook County, Illinois
- Flag of Illinois
