= 322nd Cavalry Regiment =

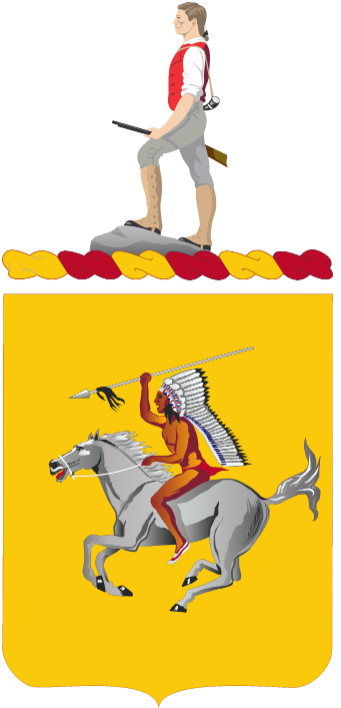
- Coat of Arms of the 322nd Cavalry Regiment
- Active: 1922–1942; 1971–1995
- Country: United States
- Branch: United States Army
- Type: Cavalry
- Part of: 89th Division (Training) (later 89th Army Reserve Command) (1971–1995)
- Mottos: "Audacter et Strenue" (Strongly and Boldly)

Insignia
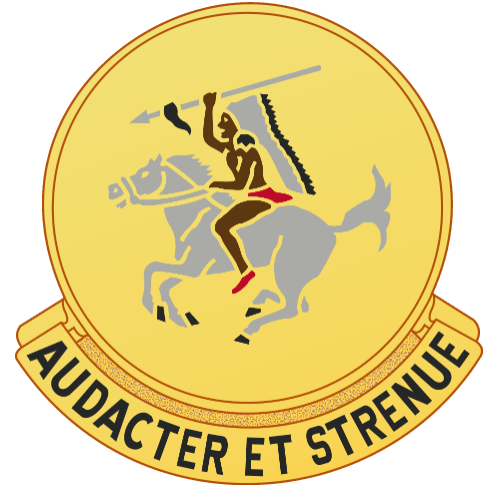
- Distinctive Unit Insignia

The 322nd Cavalry Regiment was a cavalry unit of the United States Army during the interwar period and from the Cold War to the early 1990s. The unit was activated as an Iowa and Minnesota Organized Reserve unit during the interwar period. It was converted into a tank destroyer battalion after the United States entered World War II. Reactivated in 1971 in the Army Reserve, it was eventually represented by two squadrons of the 89th Division (Training) (later the 89th Army Reserve Command) before both were inactivated in the mid-1990s.

== History ==
The regiment was constituted on 15 October 1921 in the Organized Reserves, part of the 66th Cavalry Division's 161st Cavalry Brigade in the Seventh Corps Area. It was initiated (activated) on 11 March 1922 with headquarters and 1st Squadron at Des Moines, and 2nd Squadron at Minneapolis. The regimental band was activated in 1923 at Des Moines. In July 1929, a new 3rd Squadron was activated at Minneapolis, while the 2nd Squadron relocated to North Dakota. On 10 December 1931, the 322nd's Minnesota units were inactivated and the entire regiment was simultaneously moved to Des Moines.

The 322nd conducted regular equestrian training on the horses of the 14th Cavalry Regiment at Fort Des Moines. It conducted summer training at Fort Des Moines with the 14th Cavalry, and with the 2nd Cavalry Regiment at Fort Riley. As an alternate form of training, the regiment provided cavalry training to civilians under the Citizens' Military Training Camp program at Fort Des Moines in 1929 and 1935 and at Fort Leavenworth in 1933. Its designated mobilization training station was Fort Francis E. Warren, Wyoming.

Future United States President Ronald Reagan enlisted in the regiment's Troop B at Des Moines on 29 April 1937 as a private, and became a second lieutenant on 25 May, although he soon transferred to the 323rd Cavalry Regiment upon moving to Los Angeles. After the United States entered World War II, the regiment was converted into the 73rd Tank Destroyer Battalion on 30 January 1942. The battalion was disbanded on 11 November 1944.

On 31 January 1971, it was reconstituted in the Army Reserve, represented by 1st Squadron, 322nd Cavalry, which was assigned to the 89th Division (Training) and activated at Omaha, Nebraska. In early October 1973, the 89th Division was inactivated and its personnel transferred to the 89th Army Reserve Command. Around 1975, the regiment added a Kansas-based 2nd Squadron with headquarters at Great Bend, which was initially part of the 89th's 3rd Brigade, soon transferring to the command's 5th Brigade. 1st Squadron also became part of the 5th Brigade. Troops of the squadron were based in Great Bend, Dodge City, Scott City, Salina (Troop D), and Fort Riley. The 2nd Squadron was responsible for providing advanced individual training for armor reconnaissance specialists at the Armor Training Center during its annual summer training period. It was inactivated on 5 August 1995 and disbanded on 15 September. The 1st Squadron was inactivated around the same time.

== Commanders ==
The following officers commanded the 322nd:

- Captain Harry Stimpel (11 March–April 1922)
- Colonel Harry H. Polk (April 1922–February 1927)
- Lieutenant Colonel Roland E. Murphy (February 1931–14 December 1937)
- Colonel James E. McMahon (14 December 1937–January 1938)

== Heraldry ==
The regimental coat of arms was approved on 14 January 1925 and its distinctive unit insignia approved on 4 January 1939. The distinctive unit insignia consisted of a gold colored metal and enamel device 1 1/16 (2.70 cm) in diameter with a spear-brandishing Sioux warrior wearing a war bonnet on horseback. The regimental motto, "Audacter et Strenue" (Strongly and Boldly) was attached to a scroll at the bottom of the insignia. The yellow represented the cavalry and the Sioux warrior the location of the regiment, which was formerly inhabited by the Sioux. The coat of arms was of a similar design except that it omitted the motto and included the Organized Reserve Minuteman crest above the shield.
