= 66th Cavalry Division (United States) =

- 66th Cavalry Division Shoulder Sleeve Insignia
- Active: 15 October 1921–30 January 1942
- Country: United States of America
- Branch: United States Army
- Type: Cavalry
- Size: Division
- Part of: United States Army Reserve

The United States Army's 66th Cavalry Division of the Organized Reserve was created in the interwar period out of the perceived need for additional cavalry units. It numbered in succession of the Regular Army Divisions, which were not all active at its creation. Going into World War II, the U.S. Army Cavalry contained three Regular, four National Guard, and six organized reserve cavalry divisions as well as one independent cavalry brigade, the 56th from Texas. The 66th Cavalry Division was never ordered to active duty during World War II, and the headquarters was disbanded on 30 January 1942

== History ==
The 66th Cavalry Division was constituted in the Organized Reserve on 15 October 1921, allotted to the Seventh and Ninth Corps Areas, and assigned to the Sixth Army. The division headquarters was initiated in January 1922 and established in the Army Building in Omaha, Nebraska, by Colonel William L. Luhn. The headquarters was moved several times during the period 1922–41, the first time to 22nd and Hickory Streets in Omaha in March 1924, then to Fort Omaha in about July 1930. The final move was made in August 1933 to 3614 Main Street in Kansas City, Missouri, ostensibly because of the heavy concentration of division officers in that city. The 66th Cavalry Division suffered from having its units spread out over a wide geographical area. Similar to the National Guard's 24th Cavalry Division, the division's organizations were located across the states of the Old West. The bulk of the division was located east of the Rocky Mountains, with only the units of the 162nd Cavalry Brigade being west of the Continental Divide.

The tables of organization in the division remained unchanged until 1 July 1929, when the cavalry brigades' machine gun squadrons were deleted. Other changes to the division organization were the addition of the 466th Tank Company (Light), and the expansion of the 466th Field Artillery Battalion into a regiment (and concurrently redesignated the 866th). Additionally, when the field armies were activated and army areas reallocated in 1933, the division was relieved from the Sixth Army and assigned to the Fourth Army. The 66th Cavalry Division boasted its share of interesting personalities. One example was Colonel Julien Edmund Victor Gaujot, who earned the Medal of Honor in 1911 near Agua Prieta, Mexico. The most famous alumnus of the 66th Cavalry Division, however, was Second Lieutenant Ronald Reagan, the 40th President of the United States. Commissioned in the cavalry in 1936, he was assigned to Troop B, 322nd Cavalry in Des Moines. When he moved to California to pursue his acting career in the late 1930s, he was reassigned to Headquarters Troop, 323rd Cavalry.

The division's Inactive Training Period ran from roughly September to June. The Kansas City units had their training meetings each Tuesday evening for two hours at the Ambassador Hotel or at Fort Leavenworth. Classes were usually taught by the Regular Army unit instructors, or frequently by instructors from the Command and General Staff School. Riding classes were conducted at Fort Leavenworth using horses from the 10th Cavalry. The Des Moines units also conducted their training events on Tuesday evenings and were able to use the mounts from the 14th Cavalry as well as the Fort Des Moines riding hall to perform their equestrian instruction.

The officers of the 162nd Cavalry Brigade, not being in close proximity to any Regular or National Guard cavalry units, had to use their own horses or pay out of their pockets to rent horses. The division, less the 162nd Cavalry Brigade, held consolidated summer training camps for the first two years (1922–23) at Fort Des Moines. After that, the division support units generally went to other camps designed for their respective arm or service. For example, the 406th Engineers usually trained with the 9th Engineer Squadron at Fort Riley, Kansas, the 466th Field Artillery Battalion trained with the 14th Field Artillery at Fort Riley, and the 366th Medical Squadron trained at the medical officers' training camp at Fort Snelling, Minnesota. The 161st Cavalry Brigade's units (less the 322nd Cavalry) usually trained at Fort Riley, but occasionally trained at Fort Des Moines. The 322nd trained at Fort Des Moines, but also went to Fort Riley for several summers. The 323rd Cavalry went to Del Monte, California, near the Presidio of Monterey, to train with the 11th Cavalry Regiment. Fort D.A. Russell, Wyoming, was the summer training site of the 324th Cavalry until the 13th Cavalry was transferred to Fort Riley in 1926, after which the regiment traveled to Fort Meade, South Dakota, to train with the 4th Cavalry.

In addition to the summer training camps, the units of the 66th Cavalry Division also conducted cavalry training at the Citizens' Military Training Camps. The 321st Cavalry usually supervised the cavalry camps at Forts Riley and Leavenworth, and the 322nd at Fort Des Moines. The 323rd and 324th ran the camps at Del Monte and Fort Meade, respectively. Because of the lack of assigned enlisted personnel, horses, and equipment, the 66th Cavalry Division did not participate as an organized unit in the Fourth Army maneuvers of 1937 and 1940. However, hundreds of officers and many enlisted men from the 66th participated as umpires or by being assigned to Regular Army or National Guard cavalry units to bring them up to authorized war strength. The 1940 maneuvers at Camp Ripley, Minnesota, and Fort Lewis, Washington, were the division's last major training events. For these maneuvers, the division provided over 250 officers to fill out units of the 24th Cavalry Division, and the Regular Army's 2nd, 4th, 11th, and 14th Cavalry Regiments. Many were also employed as umpires.

=== Organization 1939 ===
- Headquarters (Kansas City, Missouri)
- Headquarters, Special Troops (Kansas City, Missouri)
  - Headquarters Troop (Kansas City, Missouri)
  - 66th Signal Troop (Kansas City, Missouri)
  - 586th Ordnance Company (Medium) (Kansas City, Missouri)
  - 466th Tank Company (Light) (Kansas City, Missouri)
- 161st Cavalry Brigade (Kansas City, Missouri)
  - 321st Cavalry Regiment (St. Louis, Missouri)
  - 322nd Cavalry Regiment (Des Moines, Iowa)
- 162nd Cavalry Brigade (San Francisco, California)
  - 323rd Cavalry Regiment (Los Angeles, California)
  - 324th Cavalry Regiment (San Francisco, California)
- 466th Reconnaissance Squadron (Kansas City, Missouri)
- 866th Field Artillery Regiment (Topeka, Kansas)
- 406th Engineer Squadron (Des Moines, Iowa)
- 366th Medical Squadron (Wichita, Kansas)
- 466th Quartermaster Squadron (Rapid City, South Dakota)

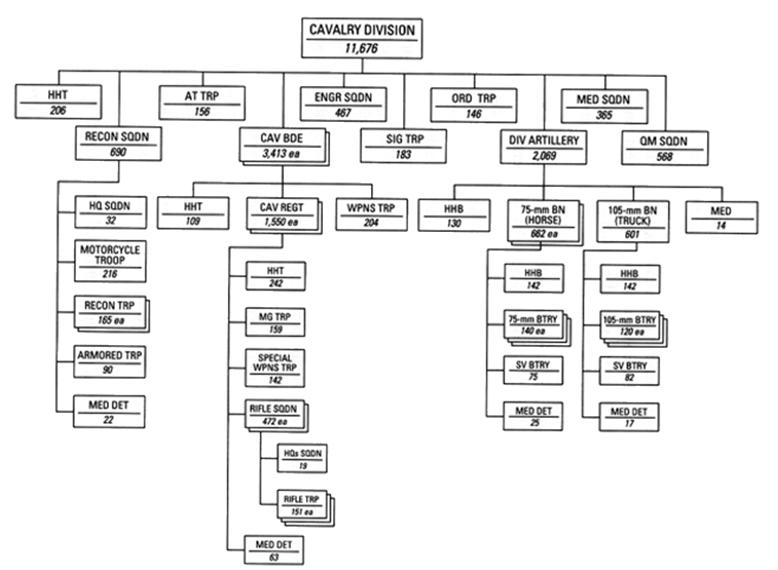
Final Organization as of November 1940

== See also ==
- United States Army branch insignia
- List of armored and cavalry regiments of the United States Army
