= 320th Cavalry Regiment =

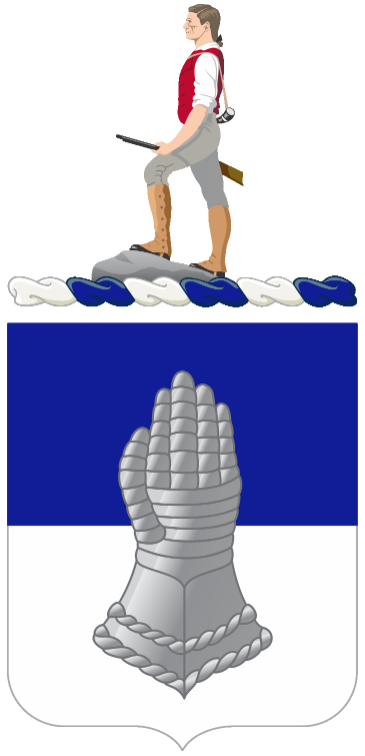
- Coat of Arms of the 320th Cavalry Regiment
- Active: 1922–1942
- Country: United States
- Branch: United States Army
- Type: Cavalry
- Part of: 65th Cavalry Division (1921–1942)
- Garrison/HQ: Milwaukee
- Motto: "Semper Paratus" (Always Ready)

Insignia
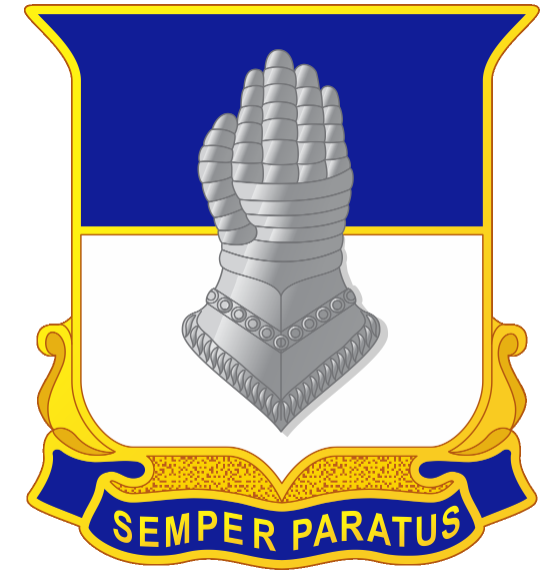
- Distinctive Unit Insignia

The 320th Cavalry Regiment was a cavalry unit of the United States Army during the interwar period. The unit was activated as a Wisconsin and Illinois Organized Reserve unit during the interwar period. It was converted into a tank destroyer battalion after the United States entered World War II.

== History ==
The regiment was constituted on 15 October 1921 in the Organized Reserves, part of the 65th Cavalry Division's 160th Cavalry Brigade in the Sixth Corps Area. It was initiated (activated) on 21 September 1922 with headquarters and 1st Squadron at Milwaukee and 2nd Squadron at Rock Island, Illinois. In July 1929, the regiment was reorganized to add a 3rd Squadron at Milwaukee.

The regiment usually held its inactive training period meetings at the 105th Cavalry Regiment Armory in Milwaukee. The 320th conducted regular equestrian training on the horses of the 105th Cavalry. It conducted summer training at Fort Sheridan with the 14th Cavalry and some years at Fort Des Moines. Its designated mobilization training station was Camp Grant. After the United States entered World War II, the regiment was converted into the 71st Tank Destroyer Battalion on 30 January 1942. The battalion was disbanded on 11 November 1944. An unrelated 320th Armored Cavalry Regiment briefly existed in Ohio postwar as a reserve unit.

== Commanders ==
The 320th was commanded by the following officers:

- Lieutenant Colonel August M. Krech (21 September 1922 – 11 March 1924)
- Colonel Robert W. Lea (11 March 1924 – 2 June 1926)
- Colonel Arthur C. Earnshaw (2 June 1926–October 1931)
- Colonel August M. Krech (October 1931–1 February 1941)

== Heraldry ==
The regimental coat of arms was approved on 13 March 1925 and its distinctive unit insignia was approved on 14 March 1925. Both were rescinded on 2 March 1959. The distinctive unit insignia consisted of a 1 1/8 inch (2.86 cm) silver colored metal and enamel device with a shield divided in half by a gold line between blue and white with a gauntlet in the center. The regimental motto, "Semper Paratus" (Always Ready), was attached to the insignia on a scroll. The gauntlet symbolized the regiment's willingness to fight to defend the United States, as well as its honor and record. The gold line symbolized the Wisconsin–Illinois border, blue was the field of the Wisconsin flag, and white was the field of the Illinois flag. The coat of arms was of a similar design except that it omitted the motto and included the Organized Reserve Minuteman crest above the shield.
