= 319th Cavalry Regiment =

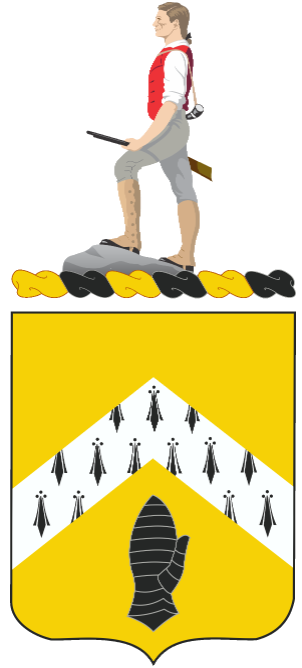
- Coat of Arms of the 319th Cavalry Regiment
- Active: 1922–1942
- Country: United States
- Branch: United States Army
- Type: Cavalry
- Part of: 65th Cavalry Division (1921–1942)
- Garrison/HQ: Detroit
- Motto: "Lead me Forward"

Insignia
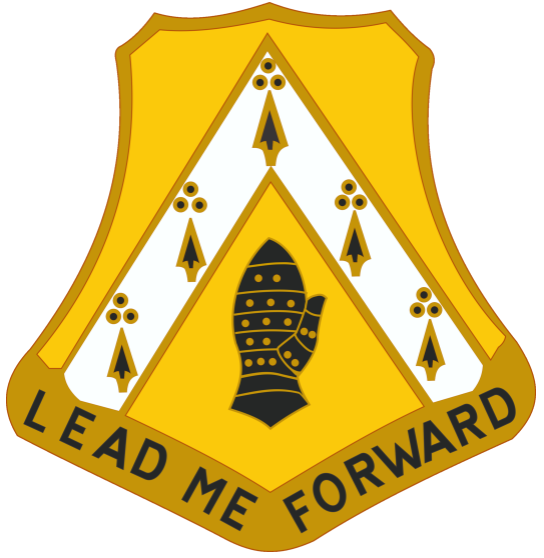
- Distinctive Trimming

The 319th Cavalry Regiment was a cavalry unit of the United States Army during the interwar period. The unit was activated as a Michigan Organized Reserve unit during the interwar period. It was converted into a tank destroyer battalion after the United States entered World War II.

== History ==
The regiment was constituted on 15 October 1921 in the Organized Reserves, part of the 65th Cavalry Division's 160th Cavalry Brigade in the Sixth Corps Area. It was initiated (activated) in April 1922 with headquarters and 1st Squadron at Detroit and 2nd Squadron at Lansing. In July 1929, the regiment was reorganized to add a 3rd Squadron at Flint. In 1930, regimental officer built the 319th Cavalry Club on property owned by a horse farm near the city. On 3 December 1930, the 2nd Squadron moved to Kalamazoo, Michigan, and the 3rd Squadron moved to Jackson, Michigan. On 28 July 1937, the entire regiment was relocated to Detroit.

The regiment conducted regular equestrian training in Detroit on the horses of the 1st Squadron, 106th Cavalry Regiment. It conducted summer training at Fort Sheridan with the 14th Cavalry and some years at Fort Des Moines. As an alternate form of training, the 319th provided cavalry training to civilians at Fort Sheridan under the Citizens' Military Training Camp program. Its primary ROTC feeder school was the Michigan State College of Agriculture and Applied Science and its designated mobilization training station was Camp Grant. After the United States entered World War II, the regiment was converted into the 70th Tank Destroyer Battalion on 30 January 1942. The battalion was disbanded on 11 November 1944.

== Commanders ==
The 319th was commanded by the following officers:

- Lieutenant Colonel Wesson Syburn (6 June 1922–January 1923)
- Colonel Pearle A. Davis (June 1924–June 1929)
- Lieutenant Colonel Harold D. Coate (June 1929–May 1934)
- Major James E. Murphy (May 1934–May 1936)
- Lieutenant Colonel John D. Saunders (June 1936–August 1937)
- Major Howell S. White (July–August 1939)

== Heraldry ==
The regimental coat of arms was approved on 9 June 1924 and its distinctive unit insignia was approved on 10 July 1926. Both were rescinded on 17 February 1959. The distinctive unit insignia consisted of a 1 1/8 inches (2.9 cm) gold colored metal and enamel device with an ermine chevron and black gauntlet on a field of yellow. The regimental motto, "Lead me Forward", was attached to the insignia on a golden scroll. The chevron and gauntlet were taken from the shield of American military commander Anthony Wayne, who fought battles in Michigan, and the yellow represented the cavalry. The words "Lead Me Forward" were spoken by Wayne after he was wounded at Battle of Stony Point during the American Revolutionary War.
