= 320th Armored Cavalry Regiment =

- Active: 1949–1950
- Country: United States
- Branch: United States Army
- Type: Cavalry
- Role: Reconnaissance
- Garrison/HQ: Cleveland

The 320th Armored Cavalry Regiment (320th ACR) was an Ohio-based reconnaissance unit of the United States Army Organized Reserve Corps, which briefly existed after World War II. It was constituted in 1948, partially organized from existing units in 1949, and inactivated in 1950.

== History ==
The 320th Armored Cavalry was constituted on 26 November 1948 in the Organized Reserve Corps, and partially organized on 29 March 1949 from existing units. The 1st Battalion was redesignated from the 320th Mechanized Cavalry Reconnaissance Squadron, constituted on 21 April 1944 as the 128th Cavalry Reconnaissance Squadron, Mechanized, and activated on 1 May at Fort Riley. It was inactivated there on 22 September and disbanded on 26 October. The squadron was reconstituted on 29 January 1947 in the Organized Reserves as the 320th Mechanized Cavalry Reconnaissance Squadron, and activated on 24 February at Cleveland.

Men of Company F before leaving for summer training, August 1949

Company F of the 1st Battalion was based at Mansfield, and Company A was based at Akron. The regiment spent its 1949 summer training periods at Fort Meade and its 1950 summer training period at Camp A.P. Hill with the 3rd Armored Cavalry Regiment. The 1st Battalion was inactivated on 28 November 1950 at Cleveland, and the 320th ACR was disbanded on 10 March 1952. The 320th was disbanded on 10 March 1952. The 320th ACR did not inherit the lineage of the prewar 320th Cavalry Regiment, and was not authorized a coat of arms or distinctive unit insignia.
