= 324th Cavalry Regiment =

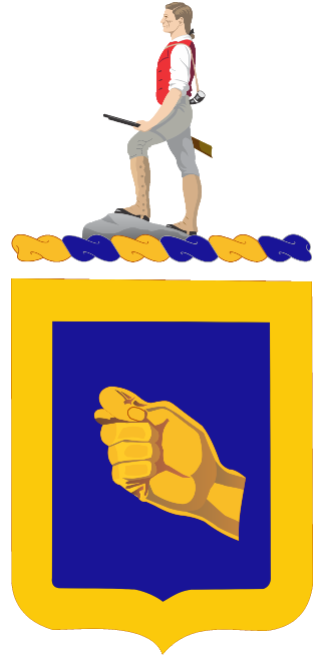
- Coat of Arms of the 324th Cavalry Regiment
- Active: 1922–1942
- Country: United States
- Branch: United States Army
- Type: Cavalry
- Part of: 66th Cavalry Division (1922–1941)
- Garrison/HQ: San Francisco (1937–1941)
- Motto: "Mah be-ah" (We Defy)

Insignia
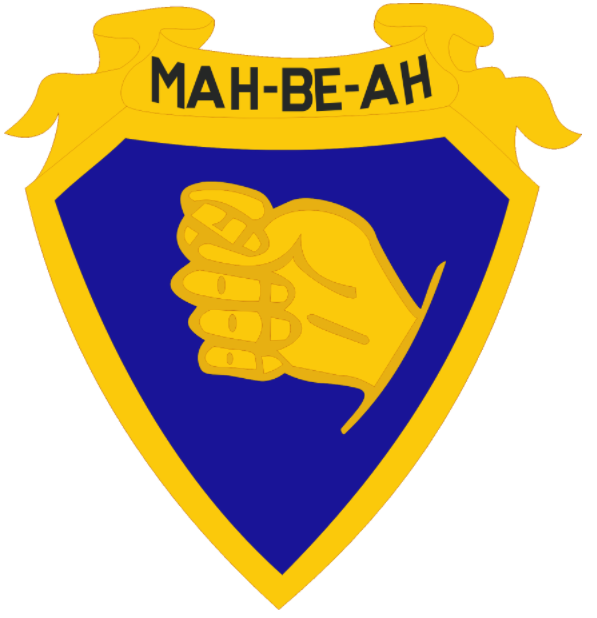
- Distinctive Unit Insignia

The 324th Cavalry Regiment was a cavalry unit of the United States Army during the interwar period. The unit was activated as a Wyoming, Utah, Idaho, and Montana Organized Reserve unit during the interwar period, although it was later relocated entirely to California. It was converted into a tank destroyer battalion after the United States entered World War II.

== History ==
The regiment was constituted on 15 October 1921 in the Organized Reserves, part of the 66th Cavalry Division's 162nd Cavalry Brigade in the Seventh Corps Area. On 14 November it was transferred to the Ninth Corps Area. It was initiated (activated) on 4 March 1922 with headquarters at Thermopolis, Wyoming, 1st Squadron at Billings, Montana, and 2nd Squadron at Salt Lake City, Utah. On 4 March 1924, the headquarters was relocated to Salt Lake City. In 1928, the regimental band was activated at Cedar City, Utah, making it the only Organized Reserve cavalry band west of the Mississippi. In July 1929, a new 3rd Squadron was activated at Boise, Idaho. For the regiment's summer training in August 1930, the 324th conducted a mounted march alongside the 4th Cavalry Regiment along the route of George Custer's 1874 Black Hills Expedition. On 14 May 1937, the entire regiment was relocated to San Francisco and its Montana, Idaho, and Utah elements were inactivated.

The 324th conducted summer training at Fort D.A. Russell with the 13th Cavalry Regiment and at Fort Meade with the 4th Cavalry. Its designated mobilization training station was Fort Francis E. Warren, Wyoming. After the United States entered World War II, the regiment was converted into the 75th Tank Destroyer Battalion on 30 January 1942. The battalion was disbanded on 11 November 1944.

== Commanders ==
The following officers commanded the 324th:

- Major Timothy J. McCoy (4 March–30 October 1922)
- Colonel Harry O. Williard (31 October–November 1922)
- Colonel Frederic Jorgenson (September 1925–June 1939)

== Heraldry ==
The regimental coat of arms and distinctive unit insignia were approved on 16 April 1929, and both were rescinded on 26 February 1959. The distinctive unit insignia consisted of a gold colored metal and enamel device 1 1/16 (2.70 cm) in height with a blue shield and a yellow border. A gold clenched hand with forefinger wrapped over the thumb was in the center of the shield. The regimental motto, "Mah be-ah" (Shoshone for We Defy) was attached to a scroll at the top of the insignia. The yellow represented the cavalry and the hand represented defiance in Indian Sign Language. The motto was in Shoshone due to the historical presence of Shoshone in the area where the regiment was organized. The coat of arms was of a similar design except that it omitted the motto and included the Organized Reserve Minuteman crest above the shield.
