= Flag of Cook County, Illinois =

County flag

Cook County
- "I Will"
- Use: Civil flag
- Adopted: June 14, 2022
- Designed by: Drew Duffy
- Use: Civil flag
- Adopted: June 13, 1961
- Relinquished: June 14, 2022

The flag of Cook County, Illinois, nicknamed "I Will", consists of a light blue pall with a green border on a field of white. Six red stars each with seven points form a circle at the flag's hoist side, drawing cues from the city flag and other symbols of the county seat of Chicago and its in-county suburbs.

Cook County is the largest county in Illinois by population. The current flag was adopted on June 14, 2022 (Flag Day). Winning a competition among almost 300 entries, the flag was designed by Drew Duffy, then a student at Glenbrook South High School, with the guidance of graphic designer Martin Burciaga from the Cook County Bureau of Administration.

== Symbolism ==
The flag design is as follows:

A white background with a blue (outline in green) version of Chicago's municipal device oriented horizontally from the hoist side of the flag left to right.

The blue portions of the key represent waterways of Cook County. The northern bodies of water include: the North Shore Channel, the Skokie River and Lagoons, the Des Plaines River, and the North Branch of the Chicago River.

The southern bodies include the Grand Calumet River, the Illinois River, Salt Creek, and the South Branch of the Chicago River.

The horizontal stripe line is for the main west to east stem of the Chicago River and Lake Michigan.

The green outline recognizes the Forest Preserve District of Cook County which surrounds the city and is found in all areas of the county, often along its waterways.

The white background stands for “innovation, commerce, and national economic leadership as demonstrated by major industries” and significant advancements in “technology, healthcare, architecture, and countless other pivotal fields.”

Inside the white triangle on the hoist end is a circle of six red seven-pointed stars. One star each for the City of Chicago (County Seat) and the following regional suburban areas; North, Northwest, West, Southwest and South.

The six stars also have historical significance, representing the foundational moments of Cook County, including:

1. Establishment of Cook County by the State of Illinois; January 15, 1831.
2. Provision of healthcare services through the County health system including John H. Stroger Jr., Provident and Oak Forest Hospitals; the Ruth M. Rothstein CORE Center, the Ambulatory Care Network and the Cook County Department of Public Health.
3. Protection of individual and voting rights through County ordinances and the conduct of free and fair elections for the entire jurisdiction of Cook County (coordinated through the Cook County Clerk's Office).
4. Protection and preservation of the environment including natural lands and open spaces (primarily through the establishment of the Forest Preserves in 1914).
5. Establishment of the world's first juvenile court system in 1899.
6. Continuation of intergovernmental cooperation with all local governments.

== History ==
The original flag of Cook County was adopted in 1961 and was first flown on June 13 of that year. The flag was adopted at the urging of Dan Ryan Jr., then the president of the Cook County Board of Commissioners. The design of that flag was based on the preexisting seal of Cook County. The seal was based on a design by Frank Wenderski, a student at Mather High School. Clarence C. Higgins, a cartographer and designer with the county's highway department finalized the design, which consisted on a map of Cook County displaying township boundaries, a scroll bearing the words "January 1831", the date of Cook County's incorporation, and a ring with 39 stars representing the 38 townships of Cook County, plus the City of Chicago. The seal was adopted in 1960. The flag consisted of the seal of Cook County on a white background with the words "Cook County" added in red lettering. At the time the flag was adopted, it was believed to be the first county flag in the United States.

Cook County commissioner Scott Britton, a member of the North American Vexillological Association, called for replacing the original flag in 2019 and proposed a competition among high school students to design the new flag. The county received 297 submissions, which were narrowed down to 23 semi-finalists. The semi-finalists were paired with professional design mentors to help them refine their submissions. In March 2022, six finalists were selected. The current flag, designed by student Andrew Duffy, was approved on June 14, 2022 (Flag Day), with final action on the resolution occurring on June 16, 2022.
