= Fort Des Moines =

Fort Des Moines can refer to:

- Fort Des Moines No. 1 (1834–1837), a U.S. Army post that grew into Montrose, Iowa
- Fort Des Moines No. 2 (1843–1846), a U.S. Army post that grew into Des Moines, Iowa
- Fort Des Moines Provisional Army Officer Training School (1901–present), a U.S. Army Reserve training center south of Des Moines.
