= Wallace Rice =

American vexillographer (1859–1939)

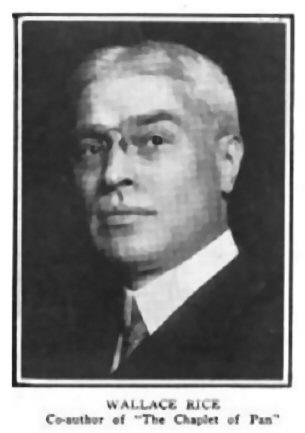
- Rice in 1911
- Born: Wallace deGroot Cecil Rice; 10 November 1859; Hamilton, Ontario, Canada
- Died: 15 December 1939 (aged 80); Chicago, Illinois, U.S.
- Education: Racine College; Harvard University (LLB)
- Occupations: Author; vexillographer
- Years active: 1885–1935
- Known for: Designing the flag of Chicago
- Spouse: Minnie (Hale) Angier (m. 1889, divorced)
- Children: 2

Wallace deGroot Cecil Rice (10 November 1859 – 15 December 1939) was an American lawyer, writer, and vexillographer. Based for most of his life in Chicago, Rice was a prolific writer and editor; however, he is most famous as the designer of the municipal flag of Chicago.

== Biography ==
First flag of Chicago designed by Wallace Rice in 1917

The Illinois Centennial flag designed by Wallace Rice in 1918

Wallace Rice was born 10 November 1859, to John Asaph Rice (1829–1888) and Margaret Van Slyke (Culver) Rice (ca 1829–1891) in Hamilton, Canada West, while his parents were temporarily residing in Canada. His father John Asaph Rice was a hotelier in Chicago, owner of the Tremont House and co-owner of the Sherman House Hotel, and noted collector of rare books, manuscripts, and Americana. As a boy, Rice attended grammar school at Racine College. After graduating from Harvard University in 1883, Rice was admitted to the bar in Chicago in November 1884. He married Minnie (Hale) Angier on 8 August 1889 in Chicago, Illinois, and they had two sons, John and Benjamin. Rice was divorced from his wife Minnie prior to 1920 and he never remarried.

Rice was a newspaperman in Chicago writing for the Chicago Tribune and the Chicago Herald American, and was a literary adviser and editor for several Chicago-based publishing houses. In 1917, he designed the Flag of Chicago. He compiled a number of stories and anecdotes from newspapers around the country. One of his major anthology works was in collaboration with Clarence Darrow in the editing of Infidels and Heretics published in 1929. He was also an accomplished author in his own right, writing historical pageants, including one celebrating Illinois' centennial and another for the semi-centennial of Birmingham, Alabama. He was also a poet and essayist. Rice died on 15 December 1939 in Chicago.

== Selected publications ==
- Rice, W. and B. Eastman. 1898. Under the Stars and Other Songs of the Sea. Way and Williams, Chicago. 61pp.
- Rice, W. 1909. For the Gaiety of Nations. Fun and Philosophy from the American Newspaper Humorists. Dodge Publishing Company, New York. 60pp.
- Rice, W. and F.V. Rice. 1909. The Wealth of Friendship. Brewer, Barse and Company, Chicago. 210pp.
- Rice, W. and F.V. Rice. 1911. The Humbler Poets: A Collection of Newspaper and Periodical Verse 1885 to 1910. A.C. McClurg and Company, Chicago.
- Darrow, C.S. and W. Rice (eds.) 1929. Infidels and Heretics: An Agnostic's Anthology. Stratford & Company, Boston. 293pp.

== Genealogy ==
Wallace deGroot Cecil Rice was a direct descendant of Edmund Rice, an early immigrant to Massachusetts Bay Colony, as follows:

- Wallace deGroot Cecil Rice, son of

- John Asaph Rice (1829 – 1888)

- Anson Rice (1798 – 1875), son of
- Asaph Rice (1768 – 1856), son of
- Amos Rice (1743 – 1827), son of
- Jacob Rice (1707 – 1788), son of

- Jacob Rice (1660 – 1746), son of
- Edward Rice (1622 – 1712), son of

- Edmund Rice (1594 – 1663)
