= Rolland V. Heiser =

Rolland Valentine Heiser
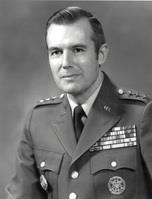
- Born: 25 April 1925
- Died: 16 June 2016 (aged 91)
- Burial place: Sarasota National Cemetery
- Military career
- Branch: United States Army
- Service years: 1943-1944; 1947–1978
- Rank: Lieutenant general
- Nickname: Ron
- Commands: 1st Armored Division; 14th Armored Cavalry Regiment
- Conflicts: Vietnam War
- Awards: Distinguished Service Medal (2); Defense Superior Service Medal; Legion of Merit (3)
- Other work: President, New College Foundation

Lieutenant general Rolland Valentine Heiser (25 April 1925 – 16 June 2016), was a United States Army officer who served in the Vietnam War.

== Military career ==
Heiser graduated from Western Military Academy in Alton, Illinois in 1943 and served as an enlisted man in the United States Army from 1943 to 1944. He received his bachelor's degree from the United States Military Academy in 1947, and his master's degree from George Washington University in 1965.

While in South Korea, he was instrumental in founding the Korea Military Academy. He served in South Vietnam as senior adviser Military Assistance Command, Vietnam, Training Directorate from 1967 to 1968.

He served as commander of the 3rd Armored Division (United States) support command and the 14th Armored Cavalry Regiment. He then served as assistant division commander of the 9th Infantry Division. He then served as Director of Plans, Office of the Deputy Chief of Staff, Operations.

In his role as Director of Plans he served as the head of the ad hoc Strategic Assessment Group to determine the role for the Army's conventional strategy post-Vietnam. The Group's findings were presented in numerous briefings to the U.S. defense community.

In May 1974 he assumed command of the 1st Armored Division remaining in the role until August 1975.

He served as the Chief of Staff of United States European Command until his retirement on 1 October 1978.

=== Decorations ===
His decorations included the Distinguished Service Medal (2), Defense Superior Service Medal and Legion of Merit (3).

== Later life ==
He resided in Sarasota, Florida.

He was a member of the New College of Florida Board of Trustees, and served as president of the New College Foundation, a position he held for 22 years. He was instrumental in raising over $25 million in funds for the college and restoring its financial health. Later serving on the Florida Board of Governors, Heiser successfully opposed the establishment of a chiropractic college at Florida State University, deeming it an unnecessary imposition on limited educational resources.

He died on 16 June 2016 and was buried at Sarasota National Cemetery.
