= 317th Armored Cavalry Regiment =

- Active: 1948–1950
- Country: United States
- Branch: United States Army
- Type: Cavalry
- Role: Reconnaissance
- Garrison/HQ: Chicago

The 317th Armored Cavalry Regiment (317th ACR) was an Illinois-based reconnaissance unit of the United States Army Organized Reserve Corps, which briefly existed after World War II. It was constituted in 1948, partially organized from existing units, and inactivated in 1950.

== History ==
The 317th Armored Cavalry was constituted on 26 November 1948 in the Organized Reserve Corps, and partially organized from existing units. Its headquarters and headquarters company (HHC) was redesignated from the headquarters and headquarters troop (HHT) of the 306th Cavalry Group, Mechanized, which had been constituted on 1 November 1946 in the Organized Reserves and activated on 20 November in Chicago.

The 1st Battalion was redesignated from the 316th Mechanized Cavalry Reconnaissance Squadron, constituted on 20 April 1944 as the 129th Cavalry Squadron and activated on 1 May at Fort Riley. Inactivated on 6 February 1945, it was redesignated as the 316th Mechanized Cavalry Reconnaissance Squadron in the Organized Reserves on 2 December 1946, and activated on 11 December at Chicago. The regiment's HHC and 1st Battalion inactivated on 15 November 1950 at Chicago. The 317th was disbanded on 10 March 1952. The 317th ACR did not inherit the lineage of the prewar 317th Cavalry Regiment, and was not authorized a coat of arms or distinctive unit insignia.
