= 323rd Cavalry Regiment =

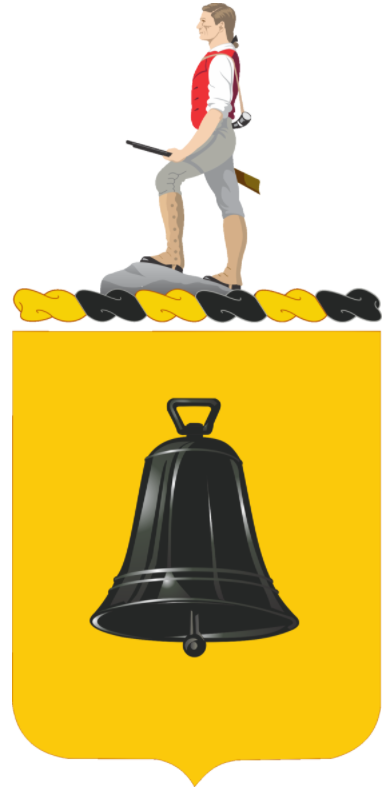
- Coat of Arms of the 323rd Cavalry Regiment
- Active: 1922–1942
- Country: United States
- Branch: United States Army
- Type: Cavalry
- Part of: 66th Cavalry Division (1922–1941)
- Garrison/HQ: Los Angeles (1934–1941)
- Motto: "Primero" (First)

Insignia
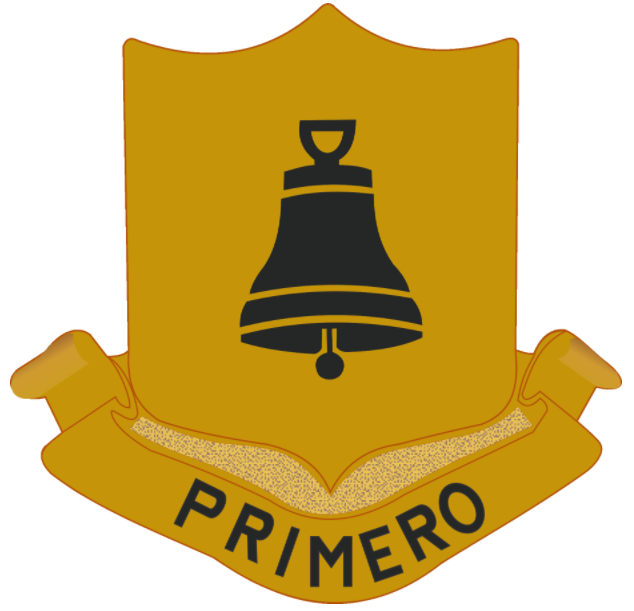
- Distinctive Unit Insignia

The 323rd Cavalry Regiment was a cavalry unit of the United States Army during the interwar period. The unit was activated as a California, Washington, and Oregon Organized Reserve unit during the interwar period, although it was later relocated entirely to California. It was converted into a signal aircraft warning regiment after the United States entered World War II.

== History ==
The regiment was constituted on 15 October 1921 in the Organized Reserves, part of the 66th Cavalry Division's 162nd Cavalry Brigade in the Seventh Corps Area. On 14 November it was transferred to the Ninth Corps Area. It was initiated (activated) on 4 March 1922 with headquarters at San Francisco, 1st Squadron at Sacramento, and 2nd Squadron at Portland with two troops in Washington. In 1924, the headquarters was relocated to San Diego, the Oregon and Washington units were inactivated, and the 1st and 2nd Squadrons moved to Los Angeles. In July 1929, the 323rd was reorganized as a three-squadron regiment. On 28 January 1930, the entire regiment was relocated to San Diego. Between 14 and 22 March 1933, many unit personnel participated in relief operations in response to the 1933 Long Beach earthquake. In 1934, the entire regiment was relocated to Los Angeles.

The 323rd conducted regular equestrian training on the horses of Troop B, 11th Cavalry Regiment at Camp L.J. Hearn between 1924 and 1929. It conducted summer training at the Presidio of Monterey with the 11th Cavalry. As an alternate form of training, the regiment provided cavalry training to civilians under the Citizens' Military Training Camp program at the Presidio of Monterey. Its designated mobilization training station was Fort Francis E. Warren, Wyoming.

Upon moving to Los Angeles, future United States President Ronald Reagan joined the regiment's Headquarters Troop as a second lieutenant on 18 June 1937. After the United States entered World War II, the regiment was converted into the 549th Signal Aircraft Warning Regiment on 30 January 1942. The regiment was disbanded on 11 November 1944.

== Commanders ==
The following officers commanded the 323rd:

- Major Eugene A. DeHermida (4 March–29 September 1922)
- Colonel Charles M. Tobin (29 September 1922–September 1926)
- Colonel Jack Hastie, Jr. (June 1929–6 October 1936)
- Lieutenant Colonel Cortez J. Cobler (6 October 1936 – 12 February 1938)
- Major Verne Austin (12 February–10 October 1938)
- Major John F. Snider (10 October 1938–January 1940)

== Heraldry ==
The regimental coat of arms and distinctive unit insignia were approved on 23 April 1928. The distinctive unit insignia consisted of a gold colored metal and enamel device 1 1/16 (2.70 cm) in diameter with a mission bell in the center of a yellow shield. The regimental motto, "Primero" (First) was attached to a scroll at the bottom of the insignia. The yellow represented the cavalry and the mission bell the regiment's location in California. The coat of arms was of a similar design except that it omitted the motto and included the Organized Reserve Minuteman crest above the shield.
