= Seal of Chicago =

Corporate insignia of the American city

- Armiger: Chicago
- Adopted: 1905
- Designer: Bernard J. Cigrand

The seal of Chicago is the corporate insignia representing the city of Chicago.

The original seal was adopted in 1837 but was replaced with the present day seal in 1905. The seal represents the authority of the City government, and often conveys to people who see it that they are seeing an official communication, bearing the city's imprimatur.

== Design ==
The city seal is defined by the City of Chicago Municipal Code, revised 2025:

The seal provided and authorized for the city shall be an obverse side with a diameter of two and three- eighths inches, the impression of which is a representation of a shield (American) gules, argent and azure (in red, white, and blue); with a sheaf of wheat in fess-point (center), or (in gold); a ship in full sail on dexter (as right side supporter) proper; on top an infant proper, in a shell argent (in silver); an Indian chief with a bow and arrow proper, on sinister (as left side supporter) standing on a promontory, vert (in green); with the motto, "Urbs in Horto", or, on scroll, gules (in gold on red flowing ribbon) at bottom of the shield; with the inscription, "CITY OF CHICAGO; INCORPORATED 4TH MARCH, 1837", or (in gold), within an azure (blue) ring around the outer edge of said seal, which seal represented as aforesaid and used with or without colors shall be and is hereby corrected, established, declared to have been, and now to be, the seal of the city. For general use, the plain impression in white containing the figures as given above, as shown herewith, shall be sufficient.

— City of Chicago Municipal Code, revised 2025

The shield represents the spirit of Chicago. The Indian (or Native American) symbolizes the first individuals who discovered the city. The ship in full sail is emblematic of civilization and commerce. The sheaf of wheat is a typical economic activity in the Chicago region. The motto ''Urbus in Horto'' is Latin for "City in a Garden". The 4th of March 1837 is the day of the incorporation of the city.

== History ==
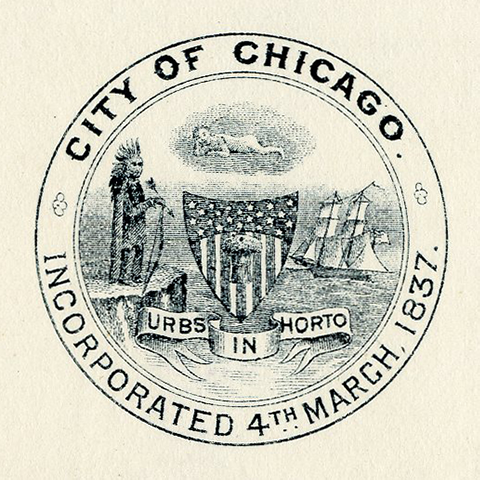
Seal of Chicago pre 1895

In 1837, when Chicago was incorporated as a city, a new seal was drafted by Mayor William B. Ogden, Aldermen Josiah Goodhue and Daniel Pearsons. In the ordinance, the seal is described as "a shield (American) with a sheaf of wheat on its center; a ship in full sail on the right; a sleeping infant on the top; an Indian with bow and arrow on the left; and with the motto ‘Urbs in Horto’ at the bottom of the shield, with the inscription ‘City of Chicago-Incorporated, 4th of March, 1837’ around the outside edge of said seal."

Modifications to the ordinance of the seal were made in 1854 and 1893, adding the sleeping infant over the shield while the latter amplified this by decreeing the baby on top, lying on its back on a shell. Following the disappearance of most and or not all of the drawing and reproductions of the original seal, the present seal was adopted in 1905.

== Controversy ==
The seal has been called racist because of the description of the sailing ship by city documents as ''emblematic of the approach of white man's civilization and commerce'' in the 17th century. Following this incident, the city-hall thought about whether 1 million dollars should be spent on the city seal. Robert Shaw, a person of color, proposed replacing it with a Native American and businessman. The decision was not to do so.

The baby sleeping in a shell also created controversy because of the posture of the infant in 1905. He is seated upright with one leg crossed and the other dangling over the edge. Experts said that no child sleeps this way. The infant was not identified as sleeping, which would have invalidated the seal of Chicago, rendering illegal all franchise and official documents, including 2 million dollars of issued municipal bonds. The decision was to not do so.
