= Alfred Råvad =

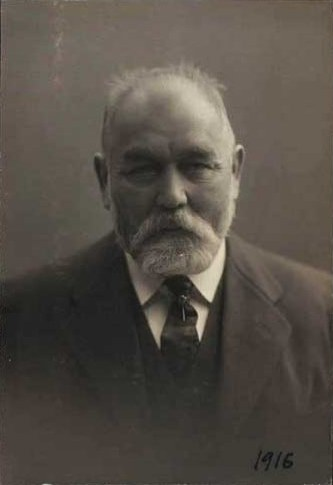
Alfred Råvad (1848-1933), Danish architect and urban planner

Alfred Christian Ludvig Jensen (since c. 1880 Alfred Råvad, and in the United States Roewade; 10 July 1848 in Rådvad – 3 April 1933 in København) was a Danish architect and urban planner.

He visited his brother, Thor Jensen, an influential businessman in Reykjavik, and had to spend the 1915 winter in Iceland due to disruptions caused by World War I. He influenced urban planning in Reykjavík. He moved to Chicago and aided Daniel Burnham in the development of Chicago's urban planning.
