= 14th Cavalry Regiment (United States) =

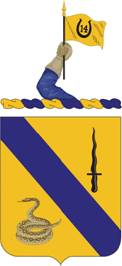
- Coat of arms
- Active: 1901 – 1972; 2000 – Present
- Country: United States of America
- Branch: Regular Army
- Type: Stryker-mounted cavalry
- Role: Reconnaissance, surveillance, and target acquisition
- Motto: Suivez Moi (Follow Me)
- Engagements: Philippine–American War; World War II; Iraq Campaign; Afghanistan Campaign

Commanders
- Notable commanders: Rolland V. Heiser

Insignia
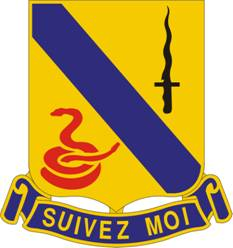
- Regimental insignia

The 14th Cavalry Regiment is a United States Army Regimental System parent regiment of the Armor Branch of the United States Army.

It had two reconnaissance squadrons that operated with Stryker brigade combat teams. Constituted in 1901, it has served in conflicts from the Philippine–American War to the Operation Iraqi Freedom and Operation Enduring Freedom in Afghanistan.

== History ==
The 14th Cavalry was constituted 2 February 1901, by War Department General Order Number 14. The unit was organized at Fort Leavenworth, Kansas, 5 March 1901.

=== Philippines campaign ===
The 14th was stationed in the Philippines from 1903 to 1906 during the insurgency campaigns. Upon successful completion of that campaign in 1906, the regiment then returned home to the United States and took up garrisons in the Pacific Northwest, where it assumed peacetime duties. The regiment was re-deployed to the Philippines in 1909, although this time it was only engaged in garrison duties and training.

=== Mexican campaign ===
In 1912, the regiment was called for service in the Mexican campaign. On the night of 5–6 May 1916, a detachment of nine troopers guarding Glenn Springs, Texas came under attack by a band of about 70 Villistas in the Glenn Springs raid, and three privates, William Cohen, Stephen J. Coloe, and Lawrence K. Rogers, were killed on American soil. The unit then joined General John J. Pershing's expeditionary forces in the Mexican Punitive Expedition against Pancho Villa and his forces during the summer of 1916, chasing bandits throughout the Mexican plains. The regiment then returned to Texas, where it began the task of patrolling the border until 1918, when it was called into service in Europe. The Treaty of Versailles was signed before the regiment could cross the Atlantic and the regiment resumed its border patrol mission.

=== Interwar period ===
The 14th Cavalry was stationed at Fort Sam Houston, Texas, as of June 1919. It was transferred on 30 April 1920 to Fort Ringgold, Texas. The regiment, less the 3rd Squadron, was transferred to Fort Des Moines, Iowa, and arrived there on 19 August 1920, while concurrently, the 3rd Squadron was transferred to Camp Dodge, Iowa, and was inactivated there on 10 September 1921. The 1st Squadron was transferred on 2 September 1921 to Fort Sheridan, Illinois. The regiment was assigned to the 2nd Cavalry Division on 15 August 1927. In April 1933, the regiment assumed command and control of the Iowa Civilian Conservation Corps District, remaining on this duty until mid-1934. The 1st Squadron participated in the “Century of Progress” exhibition in Chicago, Illinois, May–November 1933. The entire regiment was assembled for the first time since 1920 at Rock Island, Illinois, in January 1935 for regimental maneuvers and a mounted tactical march. The regiment, less the 1st Squadron, performed flood relief duties along the Mississippi and Ohio Rivers during January–February 1937. The regiment was transferred on 28 May 1940, less the 1st Squadron, to Fort Riley, Kansas, with the 1st Squadron following on 20 October 1940. The regiment maintained habitual summer training relationships with the Organized Reserve 161st Cavalry Brigade and 322nd Cavalry Regiment at Fort Des Moines, 1922–40. The 1st Squadron maintained habitual summer training relationships with the regiments of the 65th Cavalry Division (317th–320th Cavalry Regiments) at Fort Sheridan. Assigned Reserve officers conducted summer training at Fort Des Moines and Fort Sheridan.

=== World War II ===
On 15 July 1942, the regiment was inactivated, with its personnel and equipment being transferred to the newly activated 14th Armored Regiment, 9th Armored Division. On 12 July 1943, the regiment was reactivated as the 14th Cavalry Group at Fort Lewis, Washington. On 28 August 1944, the 14th Cavalry Group sailed for Europe, where it landed on Omaha Beach on 30 September and pressed east. On 18 October, the unit's two squadrons were temporarily detached; the 18th Squadron to the 2nd Infantry Division, and the 32nd Squadron to the 83rd Infantry Division.

==== Battle of the Bulge ====
The unit regained its autonomy on 12 December 1944 during the latter stages of World War II and began guarding the Losheim Gap in Belgium. On 16 December, the 14th Cavalry Group received the full brunt of the German winter counteroffensive in the Battle of the Bulge. After two days of savage fighting, the unit reassembled at Vielsalm, Belgium and was attached to the 7th Armored Division.

On 23 December, the unit secured the southern flank of the perimeter, which allowed friendly troops to withdraw to safety. On 25 December, the unit was reequipped, attached to the XVIII Airborne Corps and moved back into the Bulge to push back the German Army. After the bloody and brutal fight in the Ardennes Forest, the regiment was assigned to the 3rd U.S. Army, and ended the war near the Austrian border.

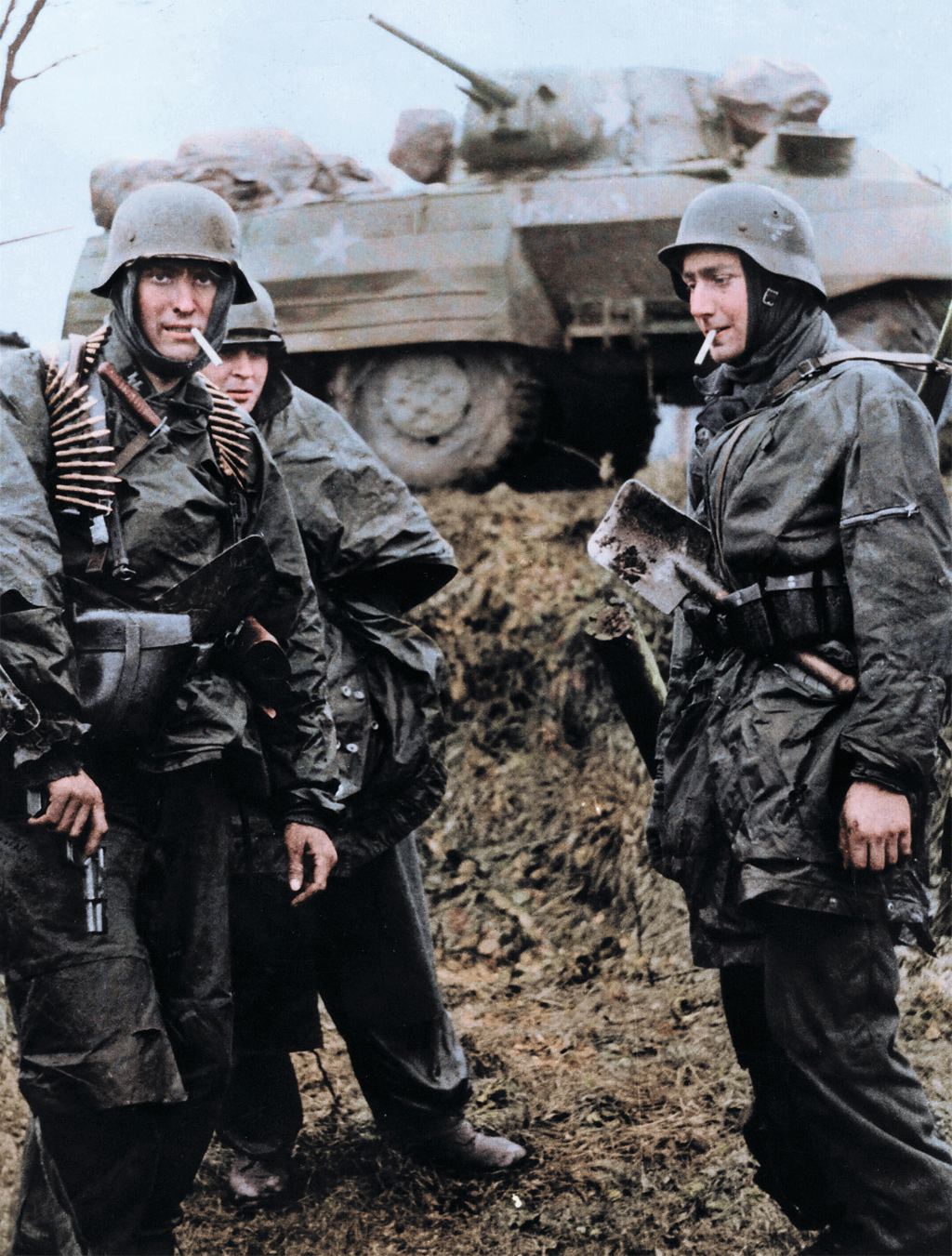
SS-Men from Kampfgruppe Hansen (LSSAH) after a successful ambush on a convoy of the 14th Cavalry Group on the road between Poteau and Recht in Belgium (18 December 1944).

=== Cold War ===
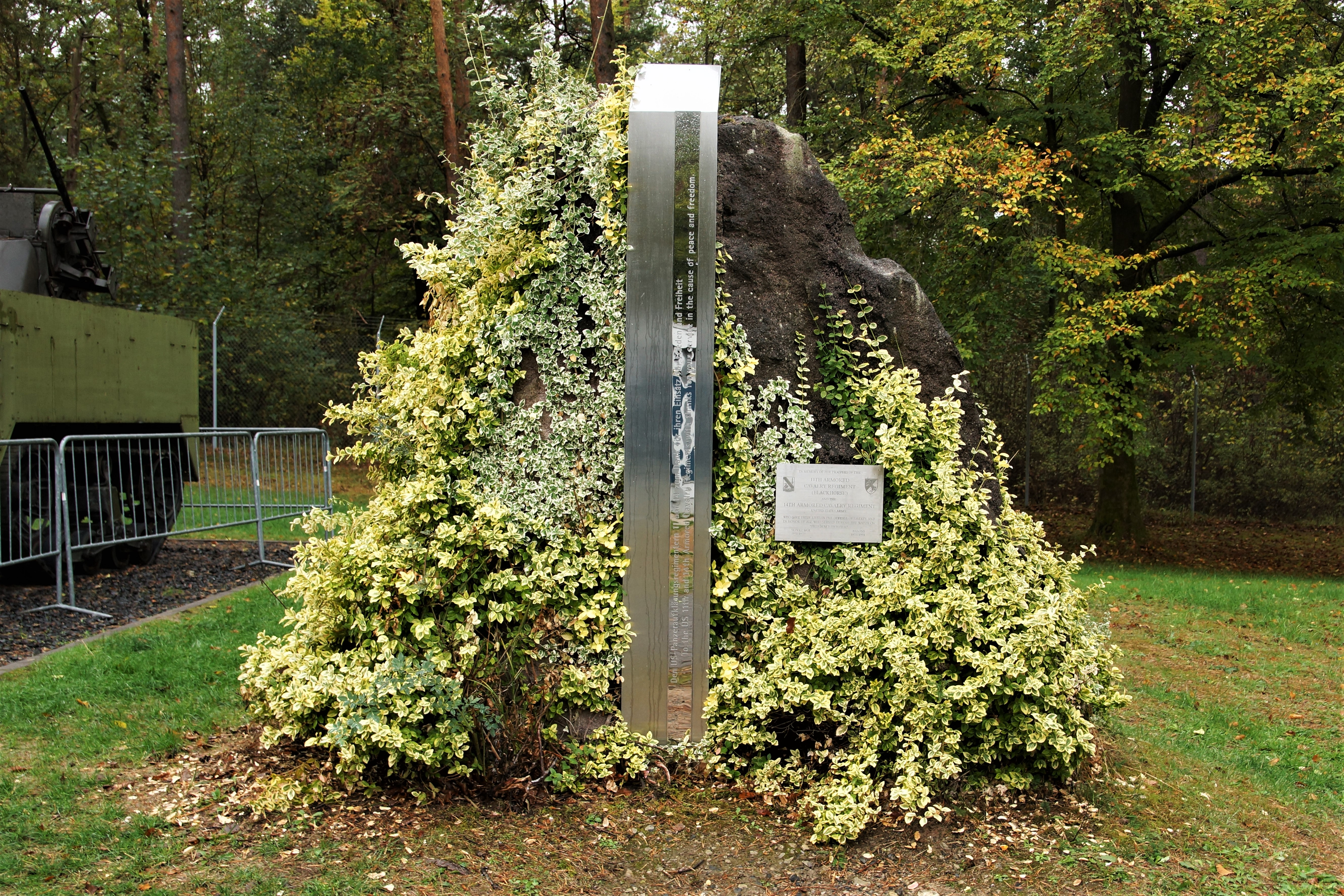
Memorial in Hesse

After World War II, the group was reorganized as the 14th Constabulary Regiment and served as a police unit until 1948, when it was again reorganized as the 14th Armored Cavalry Regiment and served until 1972 as such on "Freedoms Frontier" at Fulda, Bad Kissingen and Bad Hersfeld, Germany, performing reconnaissance and border duties for NATO until its colors were cased and it was replaced by the 11th Armored Cavalry Regiment.

=== 2000s ===
==== Iraq ====
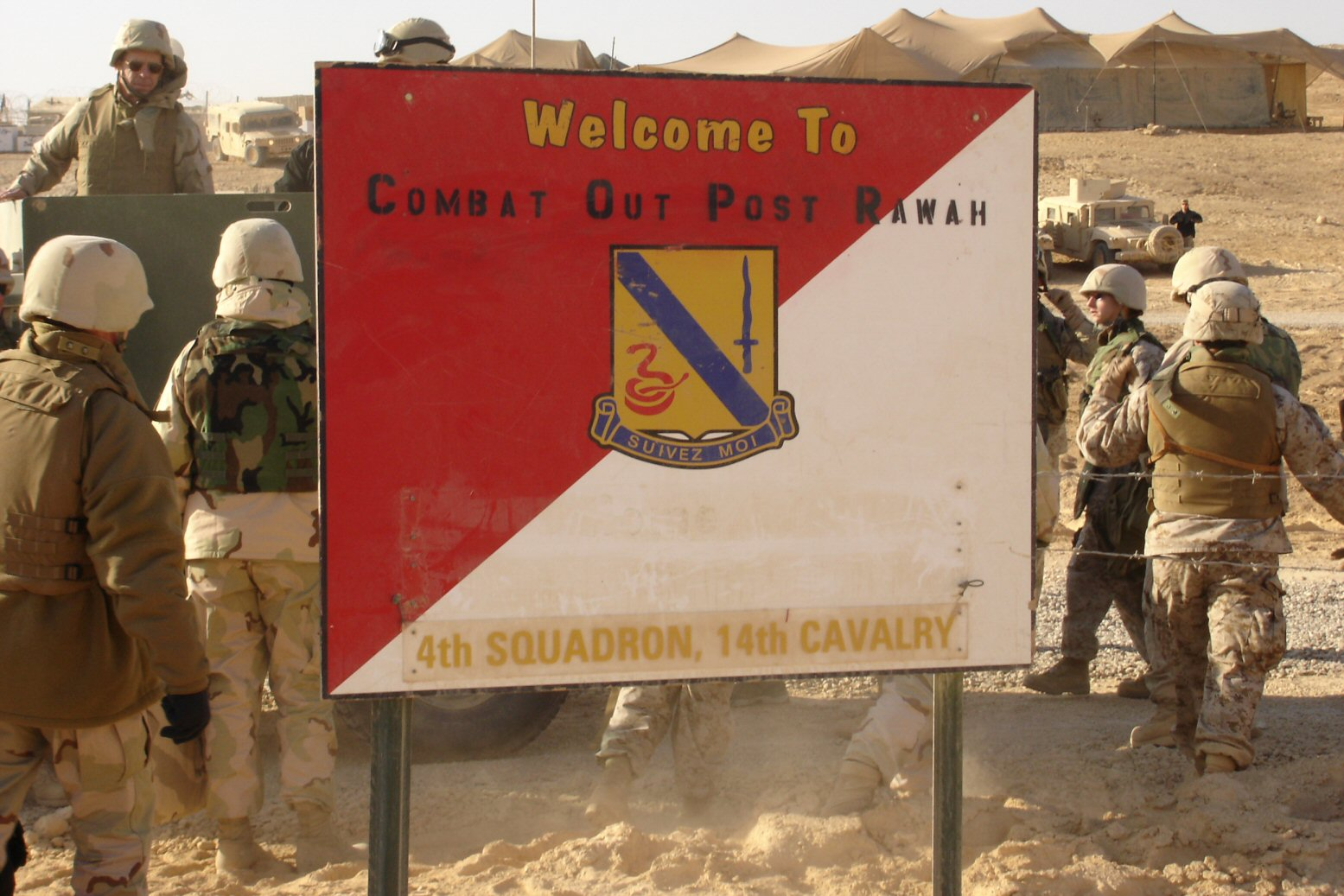
4th Squadron at Combat Outpost Rawah, Iraq, in January 2006.

The regiment was reactivated on 15 September 2000 as the U.S. Army's first reconnaissance, surveillance and target acquisition squadron in the Stryker brigade combat team. From August 2001 to May 2003 1st Squadron as a part of the Army's first Stryker Brigade Combat Team tested various medium weight combat vehicles eventually certifying the 8 wheeled, 20 ton Stryker vehicle during the first ever US Army unit to complete back-to-back Combat Training Center rotations. After training at the National Training Center in March 2003, 1st Squadron loaded its complete complement of tactical vehicles on Navy LSVs in San Diego and discharged them two days later in Beaumont, Tx. A tactical roadmarch then brought the Squadron to its next rotation at the Joint Readiness Training Center, Fort Polk, LA. Upon completion the Squadron (and its Brigade) was certified for combat deployment.

The 1st Squadron deployed to Northern Iraq in October 2003 initially assuming responsibility for the eastern half the City of Samarra. By January 2004 1st Squadron moved to Ninevah Province and relieved 3rd Brigade, 101st AASLT DIV. It conducted counterinsurgency operations in the western portion of Ninevah province until June when it was moved to Takrit, Iraq as the lead security force for logistical operations running from the Kuwait border through Baghdad and return.

In August 2004 1st Squadron returned to its parent brigade in Ninevah province this time its area of operations was the western side of the city of Mosul. The mission was assumed by the 2nd Squadron in October 2004 and, in turn, by the 4th Squadron under the 172nd Stryker Brigade Combat Team in September 2005 until December 2006. The 1st Squadron returned to Iraq in August 2006 for a 15-month deployment.

Initially slated to replace 4th Squadron in Rawah, Iraq the Squadron's mission was changed while the relief in place was taking place. 1st Squadron spent the better part of their 15-month deployment controlling the southwest portion of Baghdad. The 2nd Squadron was reflagged as the 2nd Cavalry squadron in June 2006. Upon finally returning from Iraq in December 2006, the 4th Squadron was reflagged as 5th Squadron, 1st Cavalry. The 1st Squadron returned from their second tour in Iraq to Fort Lewis in September 2007. The newest addition, the 5th Squadron, was activated at Schofield Barracks, Hawaii, on 13 October 2005 and was redesignated as 2nd Squadron, 14th Cavalry, in December 2006.

The 2nd Squadron then served in Iraq from December 2007 to March 2009. 1st Squadron deployed to Iraq for its third deployment in June 2009 establishing ground breaking Kurd-Arab-US tripartite operations in a Combined Security Area in Northern Diyala Province, Iraq; The Squadron's unrivaled team-building skills helped to foster trust amongst two ethnic groups and helped prevent a civil war while furthering to shape a free and democratic nation of Iraq. 2nd Squadron again relieved 1st Squadron in this mission from June 2010 to June 2011 in the Diyala Province.

==== Afghanistan ====
From December 2011 to December 2012, TF 1–14 CAV deployed to Zabul Province, Afghanistan, working with the Afghan National Army, Afghan National Police, and local government to conduct wide area security and build the legitimacy of the Afghan government. Bronco Troop was detached working alongside TF 5–20 Infantry in the Zhari District and later the Spin Boldak District along the Afghan-Pakistan border. Apocalypse Troop was also detached to partner with the Australian Army in Uruzgan Province to secure the region. HHT, Crazyhorse Troop, and C/52nd Infantry "Hellcats" secured the entirety of Zabul Province with two Romanian Army battalions and their Afghan partners. Throughout the deployment, the Squadron trained and mentored local forces, placing them in the lead and paving the way for future units.

==== Current status ====
- 1st Squadron, inactive, was the Reconnaissance, Surveillance and Target Acquisition (RSTA) Squadron of the 1st Brigade Combat Team (formerly 3rd Brigade), 2nd Infantry Division and was stationed at Joint Base Lewis-McChord, Washington. 1-14 CAV was formally inactivated at a ceremony in December of 2024 after the implementation of the Army Structure change (ARSTRUC).
- 2nd Squadron, inactivated December 2025 was a Cavalry Squadron of the 2nd Brigade Combat Team, 25th Infantry Division which is an IBCT and is stationed at Schofield Barracks, Hawaii.
- 4th Squadron, inactive, was under 172nd Brigade Combat Team, a Stryker unit, before being reflagged to 5th Squadron, 1st Cavalry under 1st Brigade Combat Team, 25th Infantry Division.
- 5th Squadron, inactive, was reflagged to 2nd Squadron, 14th Cavalry Regiment.

==== Recent deployments ====
1st Squadron

- Operation Iraqi Freedom (2003–2004)
- Operation Iraqi Freedom (2006–2007)
- Operation Iraqi Freedom (2009–2010)
- Operation Enduring Freedom (2011–2012)
- Department of Defense Support to Customs & Border Protection (2019)

2nd Squadron

- Operation Iraqi Freedom (2004–2005)
- Operation Iraqi Freedom (2007–2009)
- Operation Iraqi Freedom (2010)
- Operation New Dawn (2010–2011)

4th Squadron

- Operation Iraqi Freedom (2005–2006)

== Campaign streamers ==
The following streamers, representing the indicated campaigns, are flown from the colors of the 14th Cavalry:

Philippine Insurrection

- Mindanao
- Jolo

World War II

- Rhineland
- Ardennes-Alsace
- Central Europe
- Leyte
- Ryukyus (with arrowhead)

Iraq War

- Iraqi Governance
- Iraqi Surge
- Iraqi Sovereignty

== Heraldry ==
According to The Institute of Heraldry, the 14th Cavalry Regiment has been granted the following coat of arms:

"Description/Blazon:

Shield: Or, a bend Azure between a Moro kris paleways point up Sable, and a rattlesnake coiled to strike Proper.

Crest: On a wreath of the colors Or and Azure, a dexter arm embowed habited Azure, the hand gloved in a buckskin gauntlet Proper, grasping a staff erect Sable barbed Or, thereon a standard flotant of the last charged with a horseshoe heels upward encircling the Arabic numeral '14' in Black.

Motto: "Suivez Moi" (Follow Me).

Likewise, soldiers assigned to any squadron of the 14th Cavalry are authorized to wear its Distinctive Unit Insignia:

"Description/Blazon:

A gold color metal and enamel device 1 1/8 inches (2.9 cm) in height overall consisting of a shield blazoned: Or, a bend Azure between a Moro kris paleways point up Sable, and a rattlesnake coiled to strike Gules. Attached below the shield a blue scroll inscribed 'SUIVEZ MOI' in Gold letters."

The regimental coat of arms briefly tells part of the history of the unit. The black Moro Kris commemorates more than forty engagements and expeditions in which the 14th participated during the Philippine–American War. The coiled rattlesnake pays tribute to the patrol accomplishments along the Mexican Border during 1912–1918. The blue bend and gold background represent the traditional cavalry color and the uniform of the horse cavalry soldiers.

== In popular culture ==
While the 14th Armored Cavalry Regiment was inactive it was selected by author Harold Coyle to form part of the U.S. Tenth Army Corps in his 1993 techno-thriller "The Ten Thousand". It was joined by two other inactivated units: the 55th Infantry Division (as the 55th Mechanized Infantry Division) and the 4th Armored Division.

In the video game, Escape from Tarkov, Stryker variants can be found throughout the maps with the marking "3L-1-14CAV'.

== See also ==
- Observation Post Alpha
