= Fort Des Moines Provisional Army Officer Training School =

- U.S. National Register of Historic Places
- U.S. National Historic Landmark District
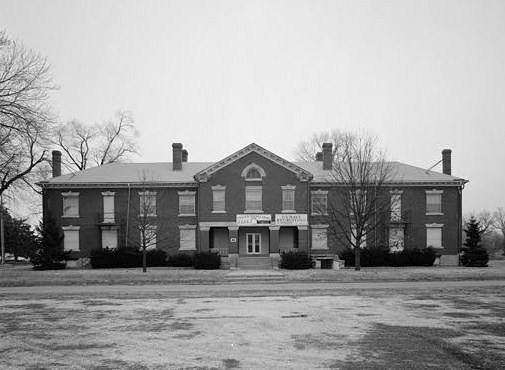
- Bachelor Officers Quarters

- Location within Iowa Location within the United States
- Location: Army Post Road, Des Moines, Iowa
- Coordinates: 41°31′31.2″N 93°36′56.1″W
- Area: 204 acres (83 ha)
- Built: 1903
- NRHP reference No.: 74000805

Significant dates
- Added to NRHP: May 30, 1974
- Designated NHLD: May 30, 1974

The Fort Des Moines Provisional Army Officer Training School was a military base and training facility on the south side of Des Moines, Iowa. Established in 1901, the base trained African American officers for the U.S. Army during World War I and was where women first began training for US Army service in 1942 as part of the Women's Army Corps. Surviving older portions of the base were declared a National Historic Landmark in 1974 in recognition of this history. The fort property was turned over to the city in the 1950s, and has since been put to a number of public and private uses.

== History ==
There have been three forts called Fort Des Moines. This facility, the third, was established in 1901 on 640 acres (260 ha), several miles south of downtown Des Moines, and at the time outside the city boundary. Initially founded as a base for cavalry, the fort was built out beginning in 1903 with barracks, stables, officers' quarters, and other facilities for this use. In 1917 the first officer candidate class of African Americans in US military history, trained at Fort Des Moines, and received commissions. Also in 1917 a training camp for black medical personnel began, and in 1918 the fort was used for the treatment of World War I casualties.

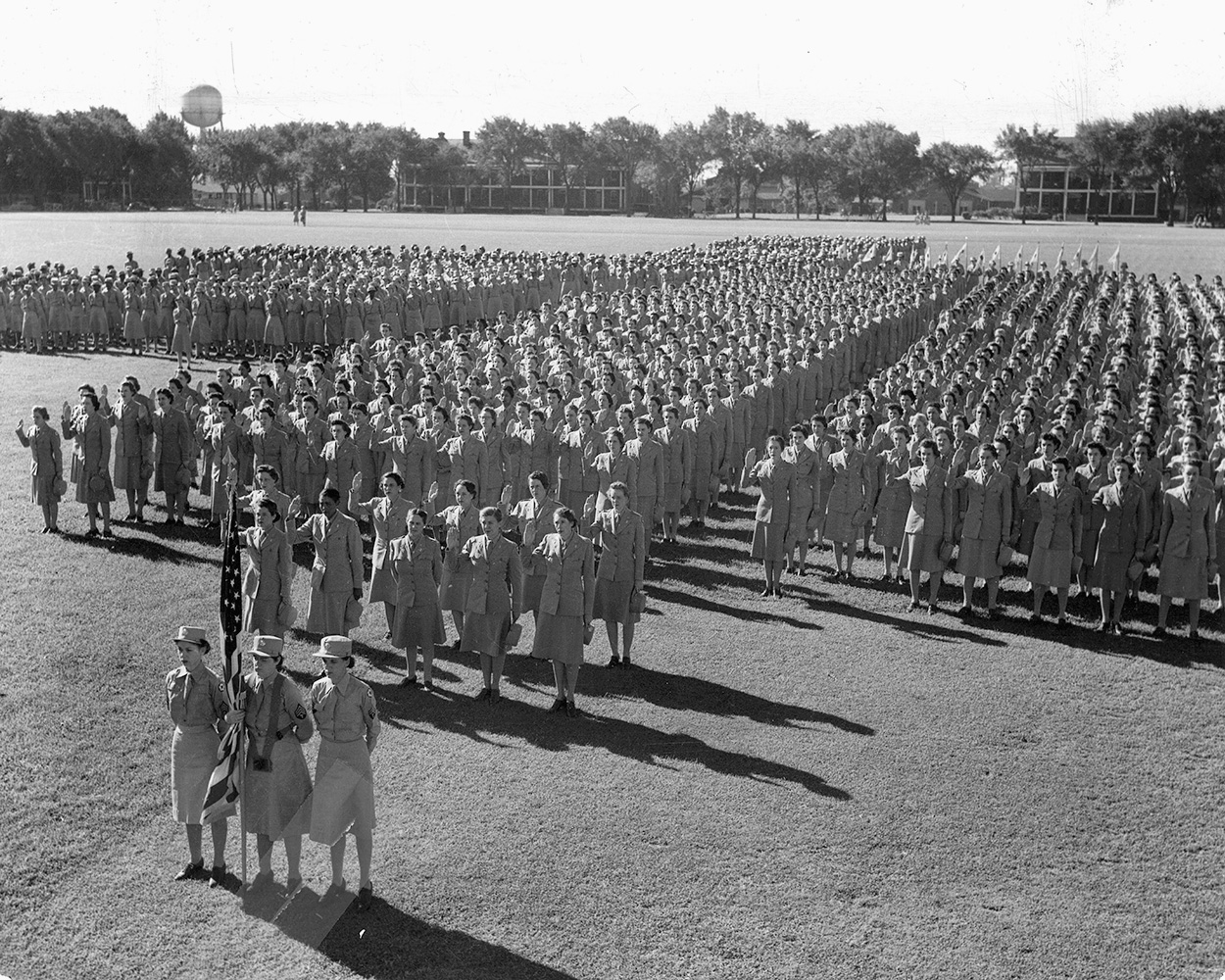
WAAC officers being sworn into the Army of the United States, Fort Des Moines, 1 September 1943.

In the 1920s and early 1930s the fort again housed military units, some cavalry, and some artillery. In 1933–34 it was used as a Civilian Conservation Corps camp. With the entry of the United States into World War II, the fort was used as a training center for women to serve in the Army's Women's Army Corps. After the war, the fort housed veteran soldiers for a time, and was turned over to the city in the early 1950s. In 1949, a portion of the old post grounds became a U.S. Army Reserve training center, which it continues to the present.

=== Establishment of the First Black Officers' Training Camp ===
In 1916, the issue of universal military service was a hotly debated topic. Southern Democratic political leaders such as Senator James K. Vardaman opposed the idea of black Americans participating in the military in any capacity. Vardaman's efforts, as well as those from other like minded southern politicians were not successful in barring black Americans from serving in the US military. However, through the National Defense Act of 1916, these politicians were able to thwart efforts to institute officer training for Black Americans.

The chairman of the Board of Directors of the NAACP at the time, Joel E. Spingarn, began efforts to establish a separate black officers’ training program after learning that both the US army and Wilson administration were against the idea of racial integration. General Leonard Wood, likewise, played an integral role in lobbying to create a segregated officers camp. When approached by Spingarn, General Wood committed to organizing a summer camp under the condition that Spingarn obtain 200 applicants (which he later revised to 250).

In February 1917, Spingarn sent a letter entitled "Educated Colored Men" to the New York Age that petitioned the black community to support the creation of a separate camp to train black officers. Response to the letter varied. Many individuals and groups in the black community opposed the idea of a segregated camp while some college administrators, professors and students backed the idea. A major supporter of the camp, George W Cook, Secretary of Howard University, was hopeful that the camp would be held at Howard. Leaders of other black colleges and universities, such as William Pickens of Morgan College, Edward Ware of Atlanta University, and Major Allen Washington of Hampton Institute were also supportive of the plan.

Many of the original applicants were fraternity brothers. The campaign to recruit from fraternities at Howard, and then Amherst and Cornell was led by George E. Brice, president of the student body at Howard University and a member of the Omega Psi Phi fraternity. Fraternities spread the word through their networks to garner support for the training program. Many applicants hoped that military service would be an important step towards equality with white Americans. By March 31, 1917, Spingarn determined that he had received a sufficient number of applications and assumed plans for the camp would move forward.

It was exactly one week later that the United States declared war on Germany. This immediately put the program's creation in jeopardy. The NAACP stepped up its efforts to fight for the camp. They, along with the significant numbers of college officials and students, lobbied members of Congress and officials in the War Department.

On April 28, 1917, Spingarn stepped down as president of the NAACP to begin his training as a military officer. In his wake, NAACP Executive Secretary Roy Nash took over the responsibility of advocating for the training camp. Upon the change in leadership, Spingarn wrote to George Brice, "I feel very sanguine that if the colored people will only take up this movement unitedly, they will obtain officers’ training for their young men."

Brice replied in a return letter, "In taking the three month training the greater number of us realize we will have to sacrifice the furtherance of our academic education, but we hope the service of our country and our race will more than pay us for the time lost in school and the lives lost in battle."

The Central Committee of Negro College Men devised an organized effort to appeal to members of Congress as well as the War Department, the Navy Department and the Secretary of the interior.

Finally, on May 12 Secretary of War Newton D. Baker stated that "the determination has been made to have a training camp for Colored men."

On May 19, 1917, the War Department announced that a three-month black officer training camp would be held in Fort Des Moines, Iowa.

==== Operations of the Camp ====
On June 17, 1917, 1,250 trainees arrived at the camp. They studied "trench warfare, infantry drill, physical drill, equipment maintenance, bayonet and saber drill, musketry training, signaling and semaphore training, and regimental organization." The schedule ran from 5:45 A.M. to 9:45 P.M. and the officer trainees were paid $100 per month.

Fort Des Moines was also used as a training camp for black medical personnel at the same time it served as a black officer training center. "Graduates of this 5-month course included 104 medical officers, 12 dental officers, and 948 enlisted men."

The camp was run by Colonel Charles C. Ballou, a white officer, although many in the black community were hoping that Lieutenant Colonel Charles Young, a black officer, would be chosen.

Colonel Ballou impressed upon his trainees the importance of the camp's success: "Your race will be on trial with you as its representatives during the existence of this training camp." Colonel Ballou had experience commanding black troops in the 24th Infantry Regiment. Ballou was replaced at Fort Des Moines by Lieutenant Colonel Henry Hunt when Ballou was promoted to Brigadier General.

The commissioning ceremony was supposed to take place in September, but was pushed back to October 10th. "“Six hundred twenty-nine men earned commissions ranging in rank from second lieutenant to captain.” in the National Army: 106 as Captains, 329 as First Lieutenants, and 204 as Second Lieutenants."

After a two-week leave, these officers received orders to report to seven army camps around the country. The officers trained black soldiers in different units. All these units were sent to fight in France as the 92nd Division. Charles Ballou had been promoted to Major General and led the 92nd Division in France.

=== Later history ===
Much of the original 640-acre base was sold off for development as the city grew. The main surviving portion of the base, organized around the parade ground, is located at the northwestern corner of that land. Portions of the former base are now used as the Blank Park Zoo, and part of the parade ground has had an apartment complex built on it. Despite this, a number of the fort's buildings still stand, mainly on the southern and eastern edges of the parade ground. These buildings, including barracks, quarters, and stables, are now used for a variety of civic and commercial purposes. These surviving elements of the fort were designated a National Historic Landmark in 1974, in recognition of their role in the advancement of African Americans and women in the United States military forces.

The Fort Des Moines Museum and Education Center honors the U.S. Army's first officer candidate class for African American men in 1917, and the establishment of the first Women's Army Auxiliary Corps (WAAC's) in 1942.

== See also ==
- List of National Historic Landmarks in Iowa
- National Register of Historic Places listings in Polk County, Iowa
