= 152nd Cavalry Brigade =

- Active: 1922–1942
- Country: United States
- Branch: United States Army
- Type: Cavalry
- Part of: 61st Cavalry Division
- Garrison/HQ: Manhattan

Commanders
- Notable commanders: Lincoln C. Andrews; Brice Disque

The 152nd Cavalry Brigade was a cavalry unit of the United States Army Organized Reserve during the interwar period. Organized in 1922, the brigade spent its entire career with the 61st Cavalry Division and was disbanded after the United States entered World War II.

== History ==
The brigade was constituted in the Organized Reserve on 15 October 1921, part of the 61st Cavalry Division in the Second Corps Area. It included the 303rd and 304th Cavalry Regiments and the 152nd Machine Gun Squadron at New York City. In February 1922, the brigade headquarters was initiated (organized) in Manhattan. Between 17 March of that year and 27 November 1931, the 152nd was commanded by Lincoln C. Andrews, who became Assistant Secretary of the Treasury. On 20 December 1928, the 152nd Machine Gun Squadron was relieved from its assignment to the 61st and withdrawn from the Organized Reserves, with its personnel transferred to one of the brigade's regiments. From 15 April 1937 to June 1939, the brigade was led by Brice Disque, the head of the Spruce Production Division during World War I.

The brigade held its inactive training period meetings on the first and third Mondays of each month at the Army-Navy Club in Manhattan. Between 1923 and 1940, the 152nd usually conducted summer training at Fort Ethan Allen with the 1st Squadron, 3rd Cavalry Regiment, but held summer training with the 3rd Cavalry Regiment at Fort Belvoir in 1937 and 1939. Its subordinate regiments provided basic military instruction to civilians under the Citizens' Military Training Camp program at Fort Ethan Allen with the assistance of the 1st Squadron, 3rd Cavalry as an alternate form of training. After the United States entered World War II, the brigade was disbanded on 30 January 1942 along with the division, after most of its officers were called up for active duty.

== Commanders ==
The brigade is known to have been commanded by the following officers:

- Major Frederick W. Wurster Jr. (3–17 March 1922)
- Brigadier General Lincoln C. Andrews (17 March 1922 – 27 November 1931)
- Lieutenant Colonel Charles W. Jacobsen (23 July 1935 – 15 April 1937)
- Brigadier General Brice Disque (15 April 1937– June 1939)
