= List of U.S. Army armored cavalry regiments =

An armored cavalry regiment (ACR) is a regiment of the United States Army (Active Component, or Reserve Component (Army Reserve or Army National Guard)) organized for the specific purposes of reconnaissance, surveillance, and security. The regiments can be equipped with Cavalry Fighting Vehicles, tanks and helicopters.

The light armored cavalry regiment was developed in the United States Army in the first years of the Cold War to replace the mechanized cavalry groups used during World War II. The new regiments primarily tasked with providing reconnaissance and security capabilities at the corps level, although also able to attack and defend either mounted or dismounted. The structure of each regiment included a headquarters and headquarters company and three reconnaissance battalions, each of which included a headquarters and service company, three reconnaissance companies, and a medium tank company.

== 1 to 100 - United States Army ==
- 2nd Armored Cavalry Regiment (now a Stryker Brigade Combat Team (BCT))
- 3rd Armored Cavalry Regiment (now a Stryker BCT)
- 6th Armored Cavalry Regiment (converted to a U.S. Army Regimental System (USARS) aviation regiment)
- 11th Armored Cavalry Regiment (now an Armored BCT)
- 14th Armored Cavalry Regiment (converted to an USARS cavalry regiment)

== 101 to 278 - Army National Guard ==
- 101st Armored Cavalry Regiment – Redesignated from existing units 1950 in the New York Army National Guard. Broken up and units redesignated 1959.
- 102nd Armored Cavalry Regiment – Redesignated from existing units 1949 in the New Jersey Army National Guard. Broken up and units redesignated 1968.
- 103rd Armored Cavalry Regiment – Redesignated from existing units 1959 in the Maine Army National Guard, reorganized 1961 as 20th Armor.
- 104th Armored Cavalry Regiment – Organized 1950 in the Pennsylvania Army National Guard. 3rd Squadron in New Jersey Army National Guard from 1968. Broken up and units redesignated 1975.
- 107th Armored Cavalry Regiment (converted to an USARS cavalry regiment.)
- 108th Armored Cavalry Regiment - Organized as the 750th Tank Battalion in the Mississippi Army National Guard with headquarters at Senatobia, MS, from 16 Feb-28 May 1956. Expanded, reorganized and redesignated with 1st, 2nd and 3rd Recce Squadrons, 108th Armored Cavalry Regiment, 1 May 1959. Ordered into Federal Service from 30 September 1962 – 23 October 1962. In 1968 the regimental headquarters became 1st Brigade, 30th Armored Division, MSARNG. 2nd and 3rd Recce Squadrons consolidated 15 February 1968 with 1st Squadron, 108th Armored Cavalry Regiment. In the late 1990s the squadron was organized as a separate regimental armored cavalry squadron and was equipped with M1A1 tanks and M3A2 cavalry fighting vehicles. 1st Squadron, 108th Armored Cavalry inactivated 2007. Note the 108th Armor Regiment existed at the same time in the Georgia Army National Guard, sometimes with the same battalion numbers.
- 111th Armored Cavalry Regiment – Constituted and organized 1949 in the California National Guard. Broken up and units redesignated 1954.
- 112th Armored Cavalry Regiment – Organized 1949 in the Texas National Guard from existing units. Broken up 1959 and units redesignated or consolidated.
- 115th Armored Cavalry – Organized 1951 in the Wyoming Army National Guard from new and existing units. Broken up 1953 and elements redesignated as units of the 115th Field Artillery Group, which later became the 115th Field Artillery Brigade.
- 116th Armored Cavalry Regiment – Organized 1949 by redesignation of existing units in the Idaho Army National Guard. Redesignated 116th Cavalry Regiment 1989 as USARS parent regiment.
- 150th Armored Cavalry Regiment – Redesignated 1955 in the West Virginia Army National Guard from new or existing units. Redesignated 150th Armor Regiment 1993.
- 163rd Armored Cavalry Regiment – Redesignated 1953 in the Montana Army National Guard from existing units. Redesignated as the 163rd Cavalry Regiment in 1988.
- 173rd Armored Cavalry Regiment – Constituted in the Tennessee National Guard and organized 1949 from existing units. Broken up 1954 and elements redesignated as units of the 30th Armored Division or disbanded.
- 278th Armored Cavalry Regiment – Constituted 1977 in the Tennessee Army National Guard and organized from existing units between 1977 and 1980. Structured as a Heavy Brigade Combat Team and as of 2017 the only "heavy" ACR in the National Guard.

== 300 to 321 - United States Army Reserve ==
- 300th Armored Cavalry Regiment – Constituted 1948 in the Organized Reserve Corps and partially organized in Texas. Inactivated 1950 and disbanded 1950.
- 301st Armored Cavalry Regiment – Constituted 1948 in the Organized Reserve Corps and partially organized in Georgia. Disbanded 1950.
- 302nd Armored Cavalry Regiment – Constituted 1948 in the Organized Reserve Corps and partially organized in New York. Inactivated 1950 and disbanded 1952.
- 303rd Armored Cavalry Regiment – Reconstituted 1948 in the Organized Reserve Corps and partially organized in New York. Inactivated 1950 and disbanded 1952. Inherited lineage of prewar 303rd Cavalry Regiment.
- 304th Armored Cavalry Regiment – Constituted 1948 in the Organized Reserve Corps and partially organized in Massachusetts. Headquarters redesignated and 1st Battalion inactivated 1950, 2nd and 3rd Battalions disbanded 1952.
- 305th Armored Cavalry Regiment – Constituted 1948 in the Organized Reserve Corps and partially organized 1949 in Indiana. Inactivated 1951 and disbanded 1952.
- 306th Armored Cavalry Regiment – Converted and redesignated 1948 in the Organized Reserve Corps and activated 1949. Redesignated 306th Armored Cavalry Group 1950. Inherited lineage of prewar 306th Cavalry Regiment.
- 308th Armored Cavalry Regiment – Constituted 1948 in the Organized Reserve Corps and partially organized 1949 in Minnesota. Inactivated 1950 and disbanded 1952.
- 309th Armored Cavalry Regiment – Constituted 1948 in the Organized Reserve Corps and partially organized 1949 in Michigan. Inactivated 1950 and disbanded 1952.
- 310th Armored Cavalry Regiment – Constituted 1948 in the Organized Reserve Corps and partially organized in California. Inactivated 1950 and disbanded 1952.
- 311th Armored Cavalry Regiment – Constituted 1948 in the Organized Reserve Corps and partially organized later that year in Texas and Louisiana. Inactivated 1950 and disbanded 1952.
- 314th Armored Cavalry Regiment – Constituted 1948 in the Organized Reserve Corps and partially organized 1949 in Tennessee. Inactivated 1950 and disbanded 1952.
- 317th Armored Cavalry Regiment – Constituted 1948 in the Organized Reserve Corps and partially organized in Illinois. Inactivated 1950 and disbanded 1952.
- 320th Armored Cavalry Regiment – Constituted 1948 in the Organized Reserve Corps and partially organized 1949 in Ohio. Inactivated 1950 and disbanded 1952.
- 321st Armored Cavalry Regiment – Constituted 1948 in the Organized Reserve Corps and partially organized 1949 in Virginia. Inactivated 1950 and disbanded 1952.

== See also ==
- List of armored regiments of the United States Army

== Bibliography ==
- Neil Baugardner, Tim Aumiller, Armor-Cavalry Regiments (c2005), last updated 20 January 2006
- Hofmann, George F.; Starry, Donn A. (2013). Camp Colt to Desert Storm: The History of U.S. Armored Forces. Lexington, KY: University Press of Kentucky. ISBN 978-0-8131-2878-8.
- Long Range Component Report. Chapter III: Existing Conditions - MSARNG Tenants. Mississippi, USA: Mississippi Army National Guard Construction and Facilities Management Office.
- Pope, Jeffrey Lynn; Kondratiuk, Leonid E. (1995). Armor-Cavalry Regiments: Army National Guard Lineage. Washington, DC.: National Guard Bureau Historical Services Division. ISBN 9780788182068.
- Sawicki, James A. (1985). Cavalry regiments of the US Army. Dumfries, Virginia: Wyvern Publications. ISBN 9780960240463.
