= 151st Cavalry Brigade =

- Active: 1922–1942
- Country: United States
- Branch: United States Army
- Type: Cavalry
- Part of: 61st Cavalry Division
- Garrison/HQ: Rochester

Commanders
- Notable commanders: Brice Disque

The 151st Cavalry Brigade was a cavalry unit of the United States Army Organized Reserve during the interwar period. Organized in 1922, the brigade spent its entire career with the 61st Cavalry Division and was disbanded after the United States entered World War II.

== History ==
The brigade was constituted in the Organized Reserve on 15 October 1921, part of the 61st Cavalry Division in the Second Corps Area. It included the 301st and 302nd Cavalry Regiments and the 151st Machine Gun Squadron at Albany. On 6 February 1922, the brigade headquarters was initiated (organized) at Rochester. From 6 June of that year to 14 April 1937, the brigade was led by Brice Disque, the head of the Spruce Production Division during World War I. On 20 December 1928, the 151st Machine Gun Squadron was relieved from its assignment to the 61st and withdrawn from the Organized Reserves, with its personnel transferred to the new 461st Armored Car Squadron.

The brigade held its inactive training period meetings on Tuesday evenings. Between 1923 and 1940, the 151st usually conducted summer training at Fort Ethan Allen with the 1st Squadron, 3rd Cavalry Regiment, holding summer training with the 3rd Cavalry Regiment at Fort Belvoir from 1937 to 1939. Its subordinate regiments provided basic military instruction to civilians under the Citizens' Military Training Camp program at Fort Ethan Allen with the assistance of the 1st Squadron, 3rd Cavalry as an alternate form of training. After the United States entered World War II, the brigade was disbanded on 30 January 1942 along with the division, after most of its officers were called up for active duty.

== Commanders ==
The brigade is known to have been commanded by the following officers:

- Captain Frank J. Liddell (6 February – 6 June 1922)
- Brigadier General Brice Disque (6 June 1922 – 14 April 1937)
- Major Edward H. Gilman (16 December 1937 – 24 September 1938)
- Lieutenant Colonel Richard N. Armstrong (24 September 1938 – 20 May 1941)
