= 304th Cavalry Regiment =

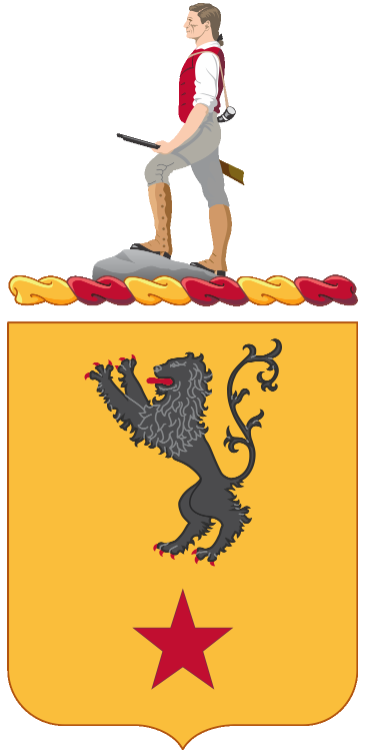
- Coat of Arms of the 304th Cavalry Regiment
- Active: February–August 1918; 1921–1942
- Country: United States
- Branch: United States Army
- Type: Cavalry
- Part of: 61st Cavalry Division (1921–1942)
- Garrison/HQ: Brooklyn (1921–1942)
- Motto(s): "El Leon Salta" (The Lion Springs)

Commanders
- Notable commanders: Lincoln Clark Andrews

Insignia
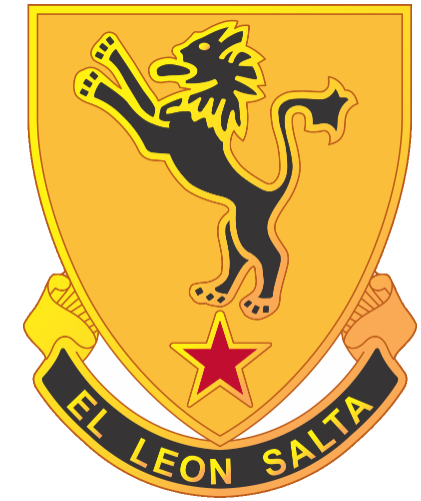
- Distinctive Unit Insignia

The 304th Cavalry Regiment was a cavalry unit of the United States Army during World War I and the interwar period. It was activated in early 1918 but broken up in the middle of the year to form new artillery units. The unit was recreated as a New York Organized Reserve unit during the interwar period, and was converted into a tank destroyer battalion after the United States entered World War II.

== History ==
Shortly after the United States entered World War I, the regiment was constituted in the National Army on 18 May 1917, and organized on 16 February 1918 at Camp Stanley, Leon Springs, Texas, commanded by Colonel Lincoln Clark Andrews. However, it was broken up on 15 August and its men were used to create the 43rd and 54th Field Artillery Regiments, and the 25th Trench Mortar Battery. The 43rd Field Artillery and 25th Battery were demobilized on 17 February 1919, and 11 December 1918, respectively. The 54th Field Artillery was demobilized on 13 February 1919 at Camp Travis.

On 15 October 1921, the 43rd and 54th Field Artillery and the 25th Trench Mortar Battery were reconstituted in the Organized Reserve as the 304th Cavalry Regiment, part of the 61st Cavalry Division in the Second Corps Area. The 304th was initiated (activated) on 7 October with the entire regiment located in Brooklyn, becoming part of the division's 152nd Cavalry Brigade. On 2 July 1929, it became a three-squadron regiment, with the new 3rd Squadron being activated in Brooklyn.

It conducted regular equestrian training on the horses of the 101st Cavalry Regiment in Manhattan. The regiment conducted summer training at Fort Ethan Allen, Vermont, with the 1st Squadron, 3rd Cavalry Regiment, and at Fort Belvoir, Virginia, with the remainder of the 3rd Cavalry. Its designated mobilization training station was the Syracuse Concentration Area in New York.

After the United States entered World War II, it was converted into the 63rd Tank Destroyer Battalion on 30 January 1942. The battalion was disbanded on 11 November 1944. An unrelated reserve unit, the 304th Armored Cavalry Regiment, briefly existed after the war in Massachusetts.

== Commanders ==
The 304th was commanded by the following officers:

- Colonel Lincoln Clark Andrews (16 February–12 April 1918)
- Lieutenant Colonel Fitzhugh Lee (12 April–17 May 1918)
- Colonel Edward P. Orton (17 May–15 August 1918)
- Major Tompkins McIlvane (7 October 1921 – 11 April 1922)
- Colonel Robert L. Bacon (11 April 1922 – 28 December 1923)
- Colonel Leonard Sullivan (29 December 1923 – 13 June 1928)
- Colonel John R. Kilpatrick (October 1928–June 1941)
- Lieutenant Colonel John F. Coneybear (June–December 1941)

== Heraldry ==
The 304th's coat of arms and distinctive unit insignia were approved on 1 June 1926. Both were rescinded on 17 February 1959. The distinctive unit insignia included a 1 1/8 in (2.86 cm) gold colored metal and enamel device, which consisted of a yellow shield depicting a springing lion with a red star with yellow border below it. The shield's color symbolized the cavalry, the springing lion represented the 304th's formation at Leon Springs, and the red star symbolized the 304th's initial organization in Texas. The regimental motto, "El Leon Salta" (The Lion Springs), was attached to the bottom of the distinctive unit insignia. The regimental coat of arms was of a similar design to the distinctive unit insignia but included the Organized Reserve's Minuteman crest above the shield and omitted the motto.
