= 301st Regiment =

301st Regiment may refer to:

- 301st Anti-aircraft Missile Regiment, Ukraine
- 301st Armored Cavalry Regiment, United States
- 301st Cavalry Regiment, United States
- 301st Field Artillery Regiment, Philippine Commonwealth Army

== See also ==
- 301st (disambiguation)
