= 304th Regiment =

304th Regiment may refer to:

- 304th Armored Cavalry Regiment
- 304th Cavalry Regiment
- 304th Infantry Regiment
- 304th (Essex Yeomanry) Field Regiment, Royal Artillery
