= 303rd Armored Cavalry Regiment =

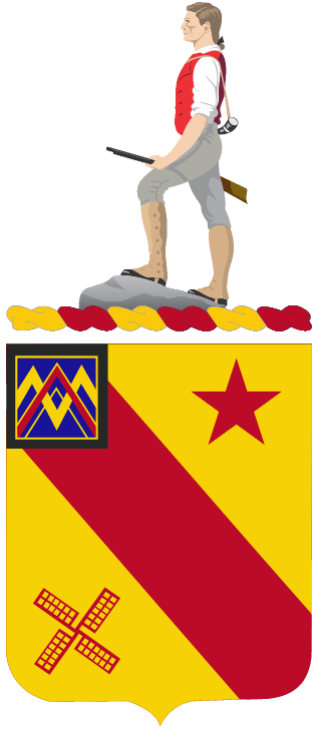
- Coat of Arms of the 303rd Cavalry Regiment
- Active: February–August 1918; 1921–1943; 1948–1950
- Country: United States
- Branch: United States Army
- Type: Cavalry
- Part of: 61st Cavalry Division (1921–1942)
- Garrison/HQ: New York
- Motto(s): "Toujours Pret et Audacieux" (Always Ready and Fearless)

Insignia
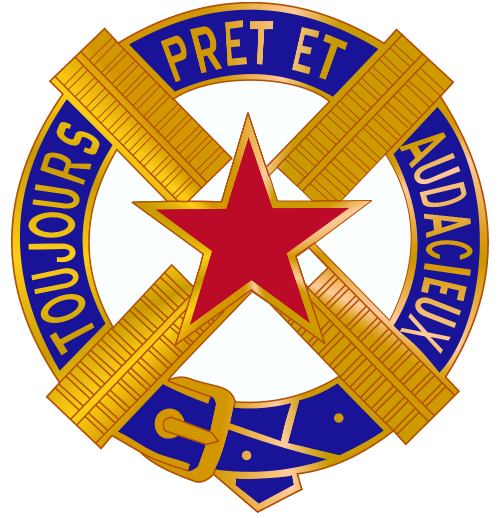
- Distinctive Unit Insignia

The 303rd Armored Cavalry Regiment (303rd ACR) was a New York-based reconnaissance unit of the United States Army Organized Reserve Corps that briefly existed after World War II.

It traced its history back to the 303rd Cavalry Regiment, a reserve unit that existed during World War I and the interwar period. It was activated in early 1918 but broken up in the middle of the year to form new artillery units. The unit was recreated as a New York Organized Reserve unit during the interwar period, and was disbanded after the United States entered World War II.

== History ==
The 303rd Cavalry was constituted shortly after the United States entered World War I on 18 May 1917, part of the National Army. Organized on 4 February 1918 at Camp Stanley, Leon Springs, Texas. It was split into the 52nd and 53rd Field Artillery Regiments and the 18th Trench Mortar Battery on 14 August. The three artillery units were demobilized on 13 February 1919 at Camp Travis, Texas.

On 15 October 1921, the 52nd and 53rd Regiments and the 18th Battery were reconstituted in the Organized Reserve and consolidated as the 303rd Cavalry, part of the 61st Cavalry Division's 152nd Cavalry Brigade in the Second Corps Area. The 303rd was initiated (activated) on 17 January 1922 with its headquarters in Manhattan. The 1st Squadron was headquartered in Manhattan and the 2nd Squadron in White Plains. The regiment's first executive officer was future World War II general Terry de la Mesa Allen. On 2 July 1929, the regiment was reorganized to add a new 3rd Squadron in Manhattan.

The regiment conducted summer training with the 1st Squadron, 3rd Cavalry Regiment at Fort Ethan Allen, Vermont, and with the remainder of the 3rd Cavalry at Fort Belvoir, Virginia. It also conducted regular equestrian training using the horses of the 101st Cavalry Regiment in Manhattan. The 303rd's designated mobilization training station was the Syracuse Concentration Area in New York. After the United States entered World War II, it was disbanded on 18 October 1943 due to most of its officers being called up for active duty.

Postwar, the regiment was reconstituted on 21 October 1948 in the Organized Reserve Corps as the 303rd Armored Cavalry Regiment, and partially organized from existing units. On the same day, the Headquarters and Headquarters Troop (HHT) was redesignated from the HHT, 303rd Mechanized Cavalry Group, which had been reconstituted on 7 October 1946 in the Organized Reserves and activated on 1 November 1946 in New York City. The 303rd's 1st Battalion was redesignated on 10 November from the 461st Mechanized Cavalry Squadron, originally constituted on 15 October 1921 as the 151st Machine Gun Squadron in the 61st Cavalry Division and organized with headquarters at Albany in February 1922. It was reorganized and redesignated the 461st Armored Car Squadron on 1 July 1929, and became the 64th Tank Destroyer Battalion on 30 January 1942 before its disbandment on 11 November 1944. The 461st was reconstituted in the Organized Reserves and activated on 27 May 1947 in New York City. The 303rd ACR was inactivated on 31 July 1950 in New York City and disbanded on 10 March 1952.

== Commanders ==
The following officers commanded the regiment between 1917 and 1941.

- Lieutenant Colonel Charles S. Haight (26 January–4 February 1918)
- Colonel Samuel McPherson Rutherford (4 February–13 August 1918)
- Colonel Latham R. Reed (17 January 1922 – 13 February 1931)
- Colonel Arthur M. Wolff (13 February 1931–June 1941)

== Heraldry ==
The 303rd's distinctive unit insignia was approved on 23 October 1925, with the coat of arms following a day later. Both were rescinded on 2 March 1959. The distinctive unit insignia consisted of a 1 1/8 inches (2.9 cm) circular blue garter with a gold edge depicting the regimental motto, Toujours Pret et Audacieux, meaning "Always Ready and Fearless". The wings of a windmill were placed over the garter and a red star with a gold border was in turn placed over the center of the windmill. The red star symbolized the regiment's initial organization in Texas and World War I artillery service and the windmill symbolized New York City.

The regiment's coat of arms included a yellow shield divided by a diagonal red stripe with the shield of the New York National Guard's 51st Machine Gun Squadron in the canton. The wings of a windmill were depicted in red in the lower left below the stripe, while a red star was located in the upper right above the stripe. The star represented the regiment's initial organization in Texas, the stripe symbolized its conversion to artillery, and the canton represented the regiment's initial composition, as more than half of its personnel in the interwar period were ex-members of the 51st Machine Gun Squadron. The Organized Reserve's Minuteman crest was located above the shield.
