= 302nd Regiment =

302nd Regiment may refer to:

- 302nd Anti-aircraft Missile Regiment, Ukraine
- 302nd Armored Cavalry Regiment, United States
- 302nd Cavalry Regiment, United States
- 302nd (Pembroke Yeomanry) Field Regiment, Royal Artillery
