= 61st Cavalry Division (United States) =

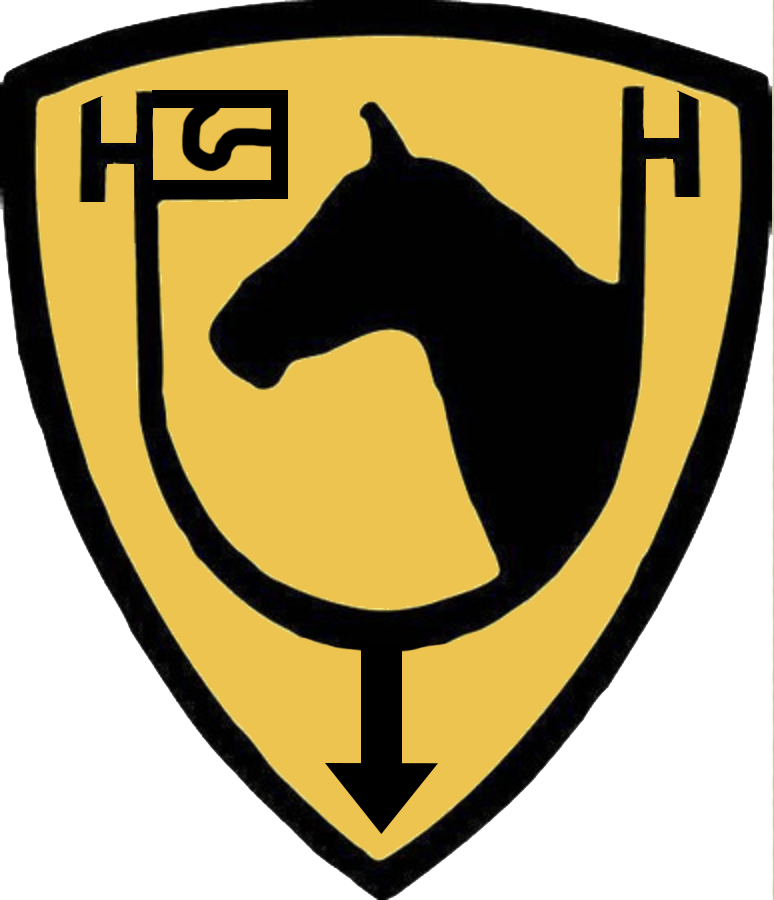
- Active: 1921–1942
- Country: United States of America
- Branch: United States Army
- Type: Cavalry
- Size: Division
- Part of: Second Corps Area
- Garrison/HQ: New York City (1922–1941)
- Nickname: "The Foragers"

Commanders
- Notable commanders: Major Gen. George B. Duncan

The United States Army's 61st Cavalry Division was an Organized Reserve cavalry division created in 1921 from the perceived need for additional cavalry units after World War I, It was composed of Reserve personnel from New York and New Jersey, and was numbered in succession of the Regular Army Divisions, which were not all active at its creation. The 61st was officially disbanded on 30 January 1942, although most of its personnel had been reassigned to other units in 1941. The unit was nicknamed "The Foragers".

== History ==
The 61st Cavalry Division was constituted in the Organized Reserve on 15 October 1921, allotted to the Second Corps Area, and assigned to the Fourth Army. The division headquarters was initiated in December 1921 by Major Frederick S. Snyder at the Federal Building in Rochester, New York. The headquarters was relocated to the Army Building in New York City in January 1922 and finally to 39 Whitehall Street in New York City in April 1922. To maintain communications with the officers of the division, Colonel William F. H. Godson, the division chief of staff, established a newsletter titled the “Forager” after the division’s nickname. In accordance with early mobilization plans, the Syracuse Concentration Area was designated as the division’s mobilization station.

The division tables of organization remained unchanged from its formation until 1 July 1929 when the machine gun squadrons were deleted. The 151st Machine Gun Squadron was reorganized and redesignated as the 461st Armored Car Squadron, while the personnel of the 152nd Machine Gun Squadron were reassigned to one of the cavalry regiments in New York City. Other changes to the division organization were the addition of the 461st Tank Company (Light), and the expansion of the 461st Field Artillery Battalion into a regiment (and concurrent redesignation as the 861st). Col. Julian R. Lindsey, division chief of staff, wrote to Gen. George Patton to complain that War Department policies were keeping cavalry units from getting the proper training they needed. When the field armies were activated and army areas reallocated in 1933, the division was relieved from the Fourth Army and assigned to the First Army.

The 61st Cavalry Division contained several soldiers who gained fame later on in World War II. For example, Major Terry de la Mesa Allen, who became the first commanding general of the 2nd Cavalry Division, and also command the famed 1st Infantry Division, the “Big Red One,” in World War II, was the executive officer of the 303rd Cavalry in New York City. The first commanding officer of the 301st Cavalry Regiment was Colonel William J. "Wild Bill" Donovan. Colonel Donovan won the Medal of Honor in World War I and was the U.S. District Attorney in Syracuse. Col. Donovan would organize the Office of Strategic Services (OSS) during World War II.

The Inactive Training Period for 61st Cavalry Division units usually ran September to May. The 151st Cavalry Brigade and other “upstate” units conducted their training events on Tuesday evenings, and were the first in the division to begin a regular schedule of marksmanship training. The 151st Machine Gun Squadron competed regularly in rifle matches against the 26th Infantry Regiment at Plattsburg Barracks. The division headquarters, 152nd Cavalry Brigade, and other New York City units had their inactive meetings on the first and third Mondays of each month at the Army-Navy Club in Manhattan. Riding classes were conducted on Thursday evenings at the 101st Cavalry Regiment Armory and correspondence courses were done on the officers' own time. The division held consolidated summer training camps for the first two years (1922–23) at Camp Dix, New Jersey. After that, the division's support units generally went to camps for their respective arm or service. For example, the 401st Engineers usually trained with the 1st Division's 1st Engineer Regiment at Fort DuPont, Delaware, the 461st Field Artillery Battalion trained with the 2nd Battalion, 7th Field Artillery Regiment, at Madison Barracks, New York, and the 361st Medical Squadron trained with the 1st Medical Regiment at Carlisle Barracks, Pennsylvania.

From 1924 to 1934, the cavalry units trained at Fort Ethan Allen, Vermont. The training plan was normally developed by the division’s Regular Army instructors and executed with the assistance of the 1st Squadron, 3rd Cavalry, and the 7th Field Artillery, both stationed at Fort Ethan Allen. In 1935, however, the 152nd Cavalry Brigade was sent to train at Fort Myer, Virginia, with the 62nd Cavalry Division and the 3rd Cavalry. The event was so successful that the whole division traveled down to train with the 62nd Division in 1937 and 1939. For the intervening years of 1936 and 1938, the division went to Jericho, Vermont, near Fort Ethan Allen, to train. The division also participated in the Jubilee Horse Show in Chicago in June 1937. The division staff also had the opportunity to function as a staff during several Second Corps Area and First Army command post exercises held in 1929, 1931, 1934, and 1936. Due to the lack of equipment and enlisted personnel, units of the 61st Cavalry Division did not participate as organized units in the First Army maneuvers of 1935, 1939, and 1940. However, hundreds of individual officers and many enlisted men from the 61st participated as umpires or by being assigned to Regular Army or National Guard cavalry units to bring them up to authorized war strength. The 1940 maneuver in upstate New York was the division’s last major training event, for although the 61st was not officially disbanded until 30 January 1942, it had almost ceased to exist by then, with most of the assigned personnel already having been called to active duty and assigned to Regular Army and National Guard units, leaving only a shell of the former divisional organization.

== Organization ==
In early 1940, the division included the following units:

- Headquarters (Manhattan)
- Headquarters, Special Troops (Rochester)
  - Headquarters Troop (Manhattan)
  - 61st Signal Troop (Buffalo)
  - 581st Ordnance Company (Medium) (Buffalo)
  - 461st Tank Company (Light) (Manhattan)
- 151st Cavalry Brigade (Rochester)
  - 301st Cavalry Regiment (Rochester)
  - 302nd Cavalry Regiment (Newark)
- 152nd Cavalry Brigade (Manhattan)
  - 303rd Cavalry Regiment (Manhattan)
  - 304th Cavalry Regiment (Manhattan)
- 861st Field Artillery Regiment (New York City)
- 461st Reconnaissance Squadron (reorganized from the 151st Machine Gun Squadron in 1929) (Albany)
- 401st Engineer Squadron (New York City)
- 361st Medical Squadron (Albany)
- 461st Quartermaster Squadron (Rochester)

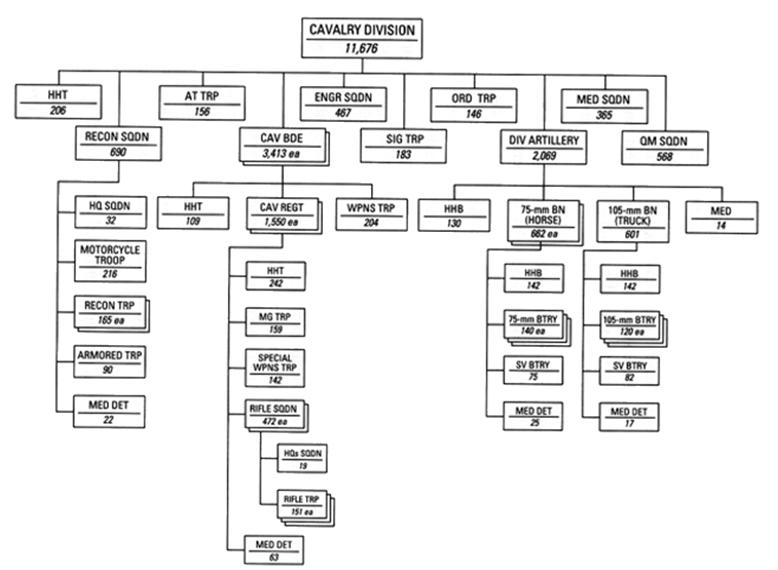
Standard organization chart for a Cavalry Division in November 1940

== Notable personnel ==
- William J. Donovan was the first commanding officer of the 301st Cavalry Regiment.
- Julian R. Lindsey would command the 14th and 328th Cavalry Regiments and the 7th and 164th Cavalry Brigades and retire a Brigadier General.
- Terry de la Mesa Allen served as the executive officer of the 303rd Cavalry Regiment.
- Brice Pursell Disque commanded the 151st Cavalry Brigade from 6 June 1922, to 14 April 1937. From 15 April 1937, to June 1939, he commanded the 152nd Cavalry Brigade.

== See also ==
- United States Army branch insignia
- List of armored and cavalry regiments of the United States Army
