= 302nd Cavalry Regiment =

Cavalry unit of the United States Army

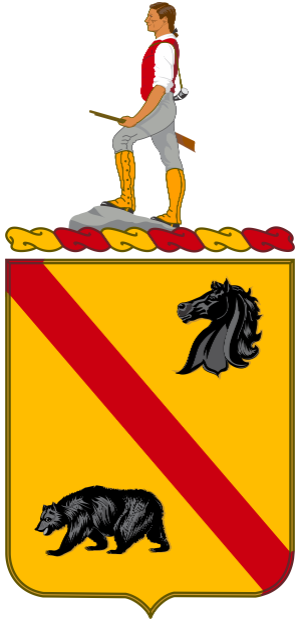
- Coat of Arms of the 302nd Cavalry Regiment
- Active: February–August 1918; 1921–1942; 1971–c. 2000s
- Country: United States
- Branch: United States Army
- Type: Cavalry
- Part of: 100th Division (United States)
- Mottos: "Celer Eundo; Concurso Ferox" (Swift in March; Bold in Attack)

Insignia
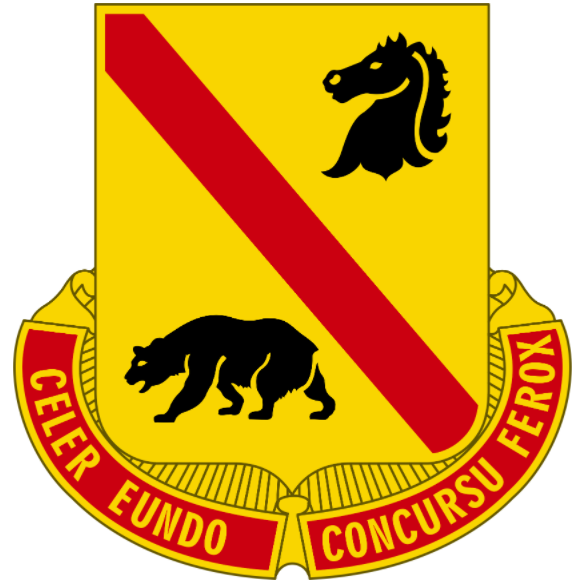
- Distinctive Unit Insignia

The 302nd Cavalry Regiment was a cavalry unit of the United States Army during World War I, the interwar period, and the Cold War. It was activated in early 1918 but broken up in the middle of the year to form new artillery units. The unit was recreated as a New Jersey Organized Reserve unit during the interwar period, and was converted into a tank destroyer battalion after the United States entered World War II. Reactivated in 1971 and 1973 in the Army Reserve, it was represented by two squadrons in the 100th Division (Training).

== History ==
Shortly after the United States entered World War I, the regiment was constituted in the National Army on 18 May 1917, and organized on 5 February 1918 at Camp Fremont. However, it was broken up on 26 August and its men were used to create the 48th and 64th Field Artillery Regiments, and the 29th Trench Mortar Battery. The 64th Field Artillery and 29th Battery were demobilized on 20 December 1918 at Camp Kearny, followed by the 48th Field Artillery in February 1919.

On 15 October 1921, the 48th and 64th Field Artillery and the 29th Trench Mortar Battery were reconstituted in the Organized Reserve as the 302nd Cavalry Regiment, part of the 61st Cavalry Division in the Second Corps Area. The 302nd was initiated (activated) on 17 December with regimental headquarters and 1st Squadron at Newark, while 2nd Squadron was located in Morristown. The regiment joined the division's 151st Cavalry Brigade. The regiment usually held its Inactive Training Period meetings at the Essex Troop Armory in Newark. It conducted regular equestrian training on the horses of the 102nd Cavalry Regiment at various armories. The regiment conducted summer training at Fort Ethan Allen, Vermont, with the 1st Squadron, 3rd Cavalry Regiment, and at Fort Belvoir, Virginia, with the remainder of the 3rd Cavalry. Its designated mobilization training station was the Syracuse Concentration Area in New York.

After the United States entered World War II, it was converted into the 62nd Tank Destroyer Battalion on 30 January 1942. The battalion was disbanded on 11 November 1944. An unrelated reserve unit, the 302nd Armored Cavalry Regiment, briefly existed after the war in New York. The 302nd was reconstituted on 1 January 1971 in the Army Reserve, with the 1st Squadron activated on the same day at Kearny, New Jersey, with the 78th Division (Training). It was inactivated at Kearney on 30 June 1973. On 1 August, the 1st and 2nd Squadrons were activated and assigned to the 100th Division (Training), with the 1st Squadron at Frankfort, Kentucky, and the 2nd Squadron at Georgetown, Kentucky. The 1st Squadron along with the division was called to active duty in 1991 to train armored cavalry scouts for the Gulf War. The regiment's units were inactivated by the mid-2000s when the 100th Division restructured changed its mission from initial entry training to provide specific Military Occupational Specialty training to four MOSs.

== Commanders ==
The 302nd was commanded by the following officers:

- Colonel George B. Pritchard (2 February–26 August 1918)
- Colonel Hobart B. Brown (17 December 1921–June 1941)

== Heraldry ==
The 302nd's coat of arms was approved on 17 December 1925 and its distinctive unit insignia on 29 July 1926. The distinctive unit insignia included a 1 1/8 in (2.86 cm) gold colored metal and enamel device, which consisted of a yellow shield divided by a red stripe with a horse's head above it in the upper right and a walking bear below in the lower left. The shield's color symbolized the cavalry, the red stripe represented its artillery service, the horse's head was from the Coat of arms of New Jersey, where the regiment was allocated, and the bear was from the Seal of California, where the 302nd was originally formed. The regimental motto, "Celer Eundo; Concurso Ferox" (Swift in March; Bold in Attack), was attached to the bottom of the distinctive unit insignia. The regimental coat of arms was of a similar design to the distinctive unit insignia but included the Organized Reserve's Minuteman crest above the shield and omitted the motto.
