= 301st Cavalry Regiment =

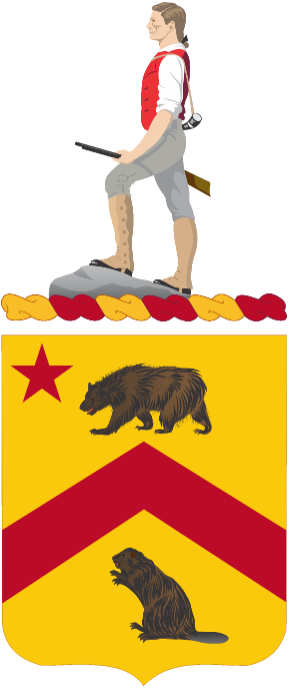
- Coat of Arms of the 301st Cavalry Regiment
- Active: February–August 1918; 1921–1942
- Country: United States
- Branch: United States Army
- Type: Cavalry
- Part of: 61st Cavalry Division (1921–1942)
- Garrison/HQ: Rochester, New York (1929–1942)
- Mottos: "Fort Et Loyal" (Strong and Loyal)

Commanders
- Notable commanders: William J. Donovan

Insignia
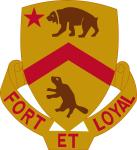
- Distinctive Unit Insignia

The 301st Cavalry Regiment was a cavalry unit of the United States Army during World War I and the interwar period. It was activated in early 1918 but broken up in the middle of the year to form new artillery units. The unit was recreated as a New York Organized Reserve unit during the interwar period, and was converted into a signal aircraft warning regiment after the United States entered World War II.

== History ==
Shortly after the United States entered World War I, the regiment was constituted in the National Army on 18 May 1917, and organized on 3 February 1918 at Camp Fremont. However, it was broken up on 27 August and its men were used to create the 46th and 47th Field Artillery Regiments, and the 16th Trench Mortar Battery. All three artillery units were demobilized on 15 February 1919 at Camp Kearny.

On 15 October 1921, the 46th and 47th Field Artillery and the 16th Trench Mortar Battery were reconstituted in the Organized Reserve as the 301st Cavalry Regiment, part of the 61st Cavalry Division in the Second Corps Area. The 301st was initiated (activated) on 15 October with regimental headquarters at Syracuse, 1st Squadron at Rochester, and 2nd Squadron at Utica. The regiment joined the division's 151st Cavalry Brigade. From 1 March 1922 to 19 June 1925, the regiment was commanded by Colonel William J. Donovan, the future head of the Office of Strategic Services. The headquarters was relocated to Buffalo in November 1924 and to Rochester in April 1929. On 25 August 1928, the 2nd Squadron moved to Buffalo, and on 2 July 1929 the regiment added a new 3rd Squadron at Buffalo.

The regiment usually held its Inactive Training Period meetings at the Culver Road Armory in Rochester. It conducted regular equestrian training on the horses of the 121st Cavalry Regiment at the Culver Road Armory. The regiment conducted summer training at Fort Ethan Allen, Vermont, with the 1st Squadron, 3rd Cavalry Regiment, and at Fort Belvoir, Virginia, with the remainder of the 3rd Cavalry. Its designated mobilization training station was the Syracuse Concentration Area in New York.

After the United States entered World War II, it was converted into the 542nd Signal Aircraft Warning Regiment on 30 January 1942. The regiment was disbanded on 11 November 1944. An unrelated reserve unit, the 301st Armored Cavalry Regiment, briefly existed after the war in Georgia.

== Commanders ==
The 301st was commanded by the following officers:

- Colonel Sterling P. Adams (2 February–28 August 1918)
- Lieutenant Colonel Nathan C. Shiverick (15 October 1921 – 1 March 1922)
- Colonel William J. Donovan (1 March 1922 – 19 June 1925)
- Colonel Nathan C. Shiverick (19 June 1925 – 18 August 1932)
- Colonel Carl H. Loebs (19 August 1932 – 11 August 1936)
- Colonel Russell R. Ward (11 August 1936–December 1941)

== Heraldry ==
The 301st's coat of arms was approved on 16 June 1924 and its distinctive unit insignia on 18 June 1925. The distinctive unit insignia included a 1 1/8 in (2.86 cm) gold colored metal and enamel device, which consisted of a yellow shield with a red chevron in the center, a red star to the left of a walking grizzly bear in the upper left corner, and a beaver below the chevron. The shield's color symbolized the cavalry, the red chevron represented its artillery service, the bear and red star were from the Seal of California, where the 301st was originally formed, and the beaver was from the Seal of New Netherland, representing its location in New York. The regimental motto, "Fort Et Loyal" (Strong and Loyal), was attached to the bottom of the distinctive unit insignia. The regimental coat of arms was of a similar design to the distinctive unit insignia but included the Organized Reserve's Minuteman crest above the shield and omitted the motto.
