= 303rd Regiment =

303rd Regiment may refer to:

- 303rd Armored Cavalry Regiment, United States
- 303rd Cavalry Regiment, United States
