= Armoured cavalry =

Military with armoured vehicles

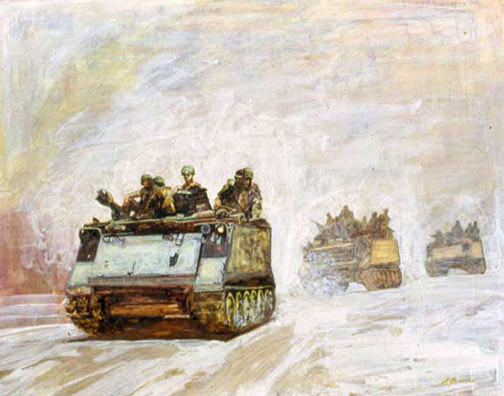
APC by David E. Graves, Vietnam Combat Artists Program, CAT IX, 1969-70. Courtesy of National Museum of the U.S. Army.

Armoured cavalry are military units using armoured fighting vehicles (AFVs) instead of horses. They began to replace horse cavalry in the heavy shock and the light reconnaissance, skirmishing and exploitation/pursuit roles in most armies commencing after the First World War. In that succeeding capacity, the obsolete name "cavalry" was retained.

Armoured cavalry, or simply armoured units, may be primarily equipped with heavy tanks or lighter and faster light tanks, armoured cars, or even scout cars in the case of what is often known as cavalry scout. Motorized or mechanized infantry may make up a portion of the unit in some countries, supported by either motorized or self-propelled artillery, with possibly airmobile troops on helicopters included.

== Historical background ==
Horse-mounted troops used various forms of armour for their own protection, and often added protective elements to their mount's tack. Horse armour included hardened leather in the ancient world, expanding to barding and even plate armour by the Middle Ages. From antiquity, light cavalry was generally more agile and more lightly protected than heavy cavalry, which used larger horses needed to carry heavier, more reinforced equipment and riders.

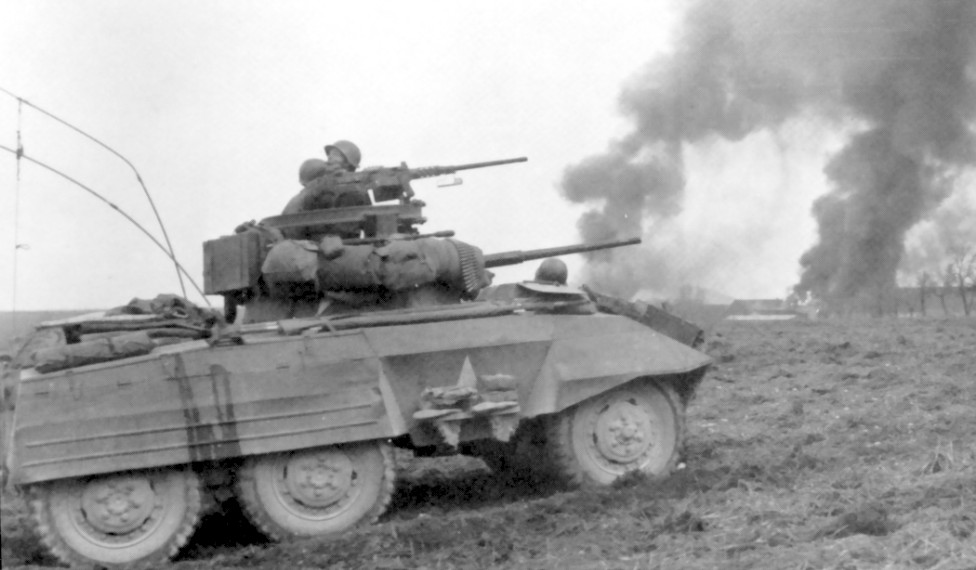
The M8 Greyhound was used in US Armored Cavalry formations during WWII

Between the late 17th and mid-19th centuries, armoured cavalry referred to those cavalry regiments that retained the cuirass, and were commonly known as cuirassiers. After the First World War cavalry units were mostly converted from horses to either armoured cars or tanks which became known as either mechanized cavalry fulfilling a reconnaissance role, or armoured cavalry serving in the offensive role that seeks to break through the enemy defences.

In October 1928, a new era began for the cavalry of the British Army when the 11th Hussars became the first regular cavalry regiment to "mechanize", to change from a horsed cavalry role to a mechanized one, re-equipping with armoured cars previously used by the Royal Tank Corps. Other regiments followed suit; in April 1939, the Royal Armoured Corps was formed to encompass the eighteen mechanized cavalry regiments of the line alongside the eight battalions of the Royal Tank Regiment, but did not include the Household Cavalry. The remaining two regular cavalry regiments were based in Palestine, and following the outbreak of war retained their horses until 1940 (the Royal Dragoon Guards) and 1941 (the Royal Scots Greys). Following mechanization, the few remaining distinctions of unit type became meaningless; cavalry regiments moved between the heavy and light armoured roles regardless of their names.

== Vietnam: U.S. armoured cavalry ==
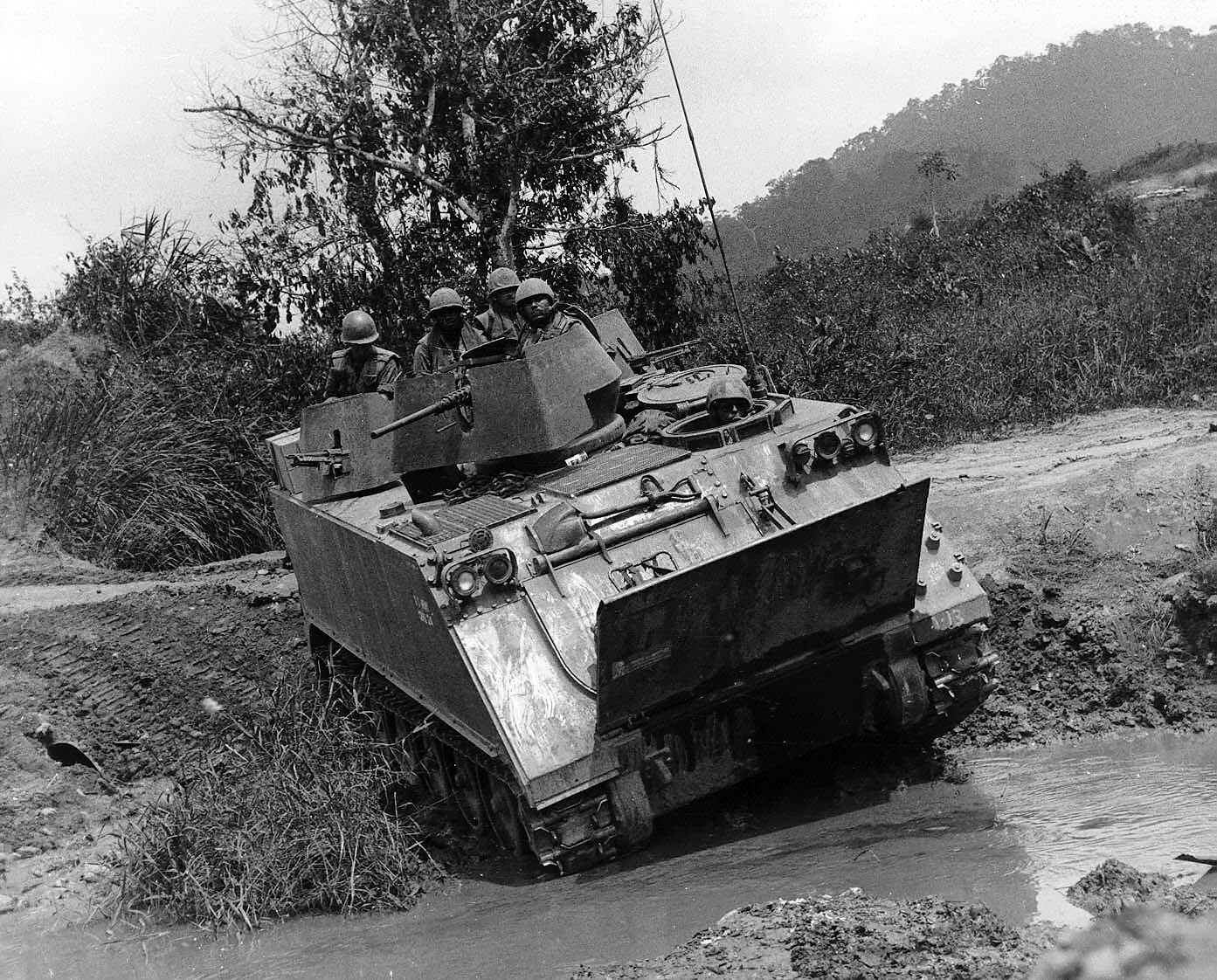
M113 ACAV in Vietnam

U.S. Army armoured cavalry had the mission of reconnaissance and security. Unlike armoured and infantry units, U.S. Cavalry is organized into squadrons and troops, which are equivalent to battalions and companies respectively. A regiment of armoured cavalry, such as the 11th Armored Cavalry Regiment (the Black Horse Regiment) in Vietnam, consisted of three full squadrons of armoured cavalry. The squadron normally consisted of a headquarters troop, three cavalry troops, a tank company, a 155-mm self-propelled howitzer battery, and an aviation troop. The three ground troops were a mixture of M48 Patton or M551 Sheridan tanks and M113 ACAVs (Armored Cavalry Assault Vehicles). The aviation troop of the squadron was equipped with helicopters, consisting of UH-1 transports, OH-6 Cayuse scouts, OH-58 Kiowa scout/gunships, and AH-1 Cobra gunships.

Armoured cavalry regiments operated in country for the Corps/Theater Commander, while the squadrons operated as the "eyes and ears" for the US Army Division Commanders. An Army brigade would only be authorized a cavalry troop, and not a whole cavalry squadron.

According to Army doctrine, the cavalry would find the enemy, and hold the enemy in place, until the heavy forces were brought up to deal with the located enemy. This process was known as the battle hand-off. At this point the cavalry is free to disengage and continue with other missions. Security missions could be rear guard, flank guard, or advance guard – the same functions as performed by infantrymen, only with tanks and ACAVs. With the infantry, the advance guard would be called the point man.

During the Vietnam War, the mission of armour (tanks) was to close with the enemy and defeat them using firepower, manoeuvre, and shock action. With the US Infantry, the mission was the same, minus the shock power. Artillery's mission was to add firepower to the equation. The US Armored Cavalry's mission was to find the enemy and/or provide security for the Army, while having the means to destroy the enemy if becoming decisively engaged. In Vietnam, the US Army deployed 1 Armored Cavalry Regiment (containing 3 squadrons and an aviation squadron), 7 Armored Cavalry Squadrons, and 2 Armored Cavalry Troops:

- 11th Armored Cavalry Regiment
  - 1st Squadron
  - 2nd Squadron
  - 3rd Squadron
  - Regimental Aviation Squadron
- 1st Squadron, 1st Cavalry Regiment
- 2nd Squadron, 1st Cavalry Regiment
- 1st Squadron, 4th Cavalry Regiment
- 3rd Squadron, 4th Cavalry Regiment
- 3rd Squadron, 5th Cavalry Regiment
- 1st Squadron, 10th Cavalry Regiment
- 2nd Squadron, 17th Cavalry Regiment
- Troop A, 4th Squadron, 12th Cavalry Regiment
- Troop B, 1st Squadron, 17th Cavalry Regiment

From about January 1969 until the last mounted unit re-deployed from Vietnam in 1972 (air units remained in country), most armoured cavalry units (except the 11th ACR's tank companies) were equipped with the M551 Sheridan armored airborne reconnaissance assault vehicle (today, known to historians as a light tank).

== Other usage ==
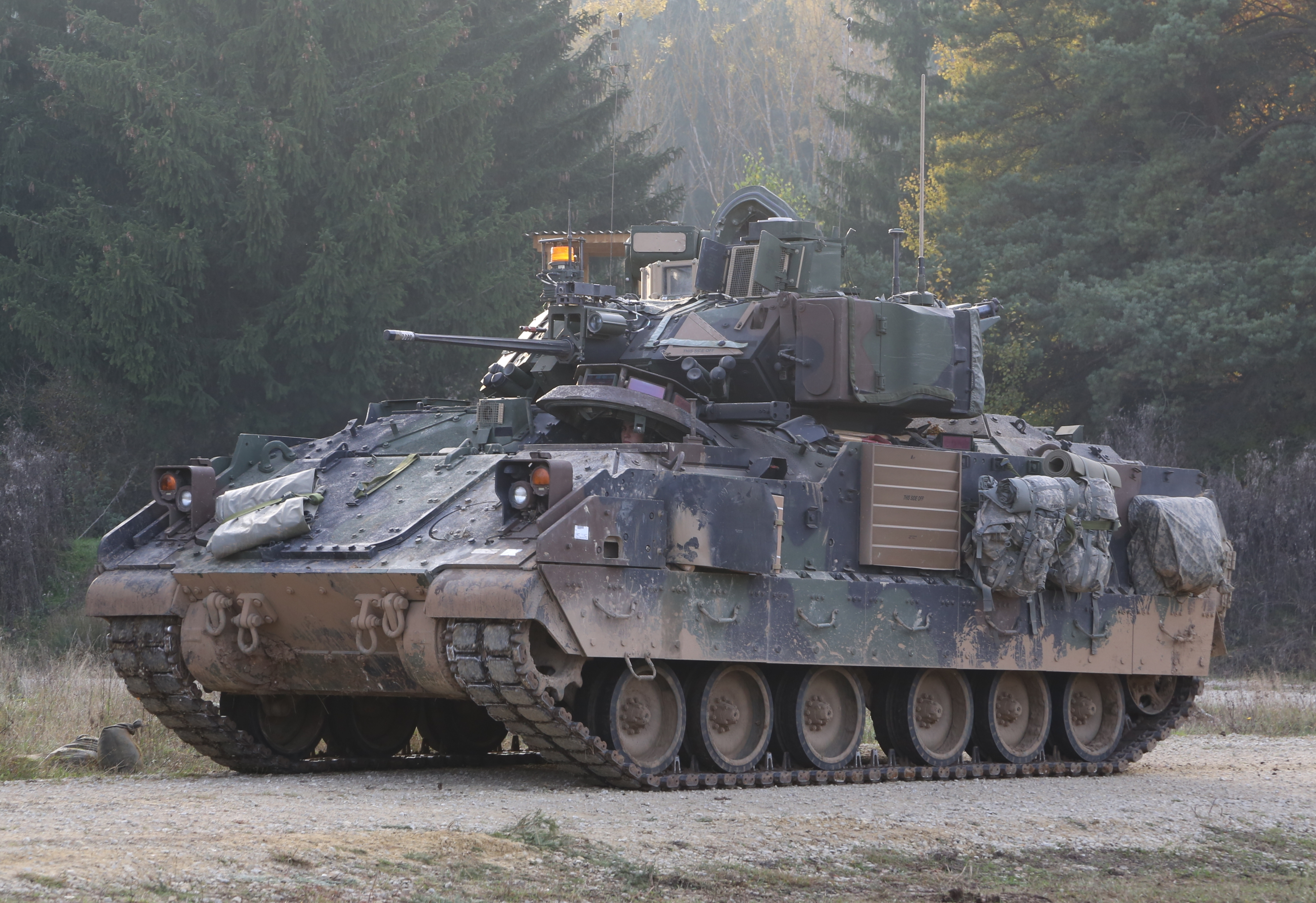
A U.S. Army M3 Bradley in Germany in 2015

Armoured cavalry units can use hunter-killer teams. Scout vehicles and tanks can operate in concert, suited respectively as "hunters" and "killers". For instance, in U.S. land forces, the cavalry scouts of a team (often mounted in M3 Bradley Cavalry Fighting Vehicles) go in search of enemy positions, and flush the enemy into a designated kill zone where the armored units can inflict more damage on the enemy than the "hunters" alone could hope to.

== See also ==
- Armoured Cavalry Arm – main armoured force of France
- Air cavalry
- List of US Army armored cavalry regiments

Current British cavalry regiments in armoured role

- The Royal Scots Dragoon Guards (Carabiniers and Greys)
- The Royal Dragoon Guards
- The Queen's Royal Hussars (The Queen's Own and Royal Irish)
- The King's Royal Hussars
- 2nd Royal Tank Regiment
