= Loyal Legion =

Loyal Legion may refer to:

- The Military Order of the Loyal Legion of the United States, a fraternity composed of former Union Army officers from the American Civil War (and, later, of their descendants)
- The Loyal Legion of Loggers and Lumbermen (LLLL), formed by the U.S. War Department during World War I as a counter to the Industrial Workers of the World (IWW)
