= 301st Field Artillery Regiment =

301st Field Artillery Regiment (PA)
- Active: November 1941 - April 9, 1942
- Disbanded: April 9, 1942
- Countries: United States; Philippines
- Allegiance: United States Army; Philippine Commonwealth Army
- Branch: Army
- Type: Heavy Field Artillery
- Role: Corps Artillery
- Size: 1,500
- Part of: II Corps
- Equipment: M1918 155mm Howitzers; Canon de 155mm GPF
- Engagements: Battle of Bataan

Commanders
- Notable commanders: Lieutenant Colonel Alexander Quintard, USA

301st Field Artillery Regiment, is a heavy artillery non-divisional unit of Philippine Commonwealth Army activated in November 1941 to be used as Corps Artillery. It was activated in Camp Del Pilar, Dau, Pampanga. It fought in Battle of Bataan inflicting heavy casualties to Japanese in Abucay-Mauban Line and Orion-Bagac Line.

== Organization ==
The regiment was the last unit activated and organized of the Philippine Army as there was substantial 155mm Guns available for heavy artillery units. USAFFE Chief of Artillery Brigadier General Edward P. King Jr ordered to move all 155mm guns from Camp Murphy to Bataan and create a unit to be equipped with these long range 155mm guns and ready to expand it to a regiment. Lieutenant Colonel Alexander Quintard who was in Mindanao as commander of an artillery unit there was flown to Luzon to command.

The regiment was still in training when hostilities started and it did not participated in opposing the Japanese landings. It was equipped with long range guns of sixteen 155mm guns (GPF) and two 155-mm howitzers, In preparation of retreat to Bataan, the regiment was ordered to the peninsula and prepared a firing position to cover the retreating units.

== Battle of Bataan ==
301st was posted in II Philippine Corps area under Major General George M. Parker, their position in Abucay, Bataan was to support 57th Infantry Regiment (PS) to oppose the Japanese advance in Abucay-Orion road.

=== Mauban-Abucay Line ===
On January 9, 1942, Japanese assaulted the line and the USAFFE artilleries inflicted them heavy casualties due to its accurate firing. However, due to the gap between I and II Corps at Mt. Natib, Japanese exploited it and penetrated this line. General MacArthur ordered both Corps to retreat south towards the next Main Line of Resistance.

=== Orion-Bagac Line ===
Again on February 23, 1942, General Homma moved his troops to attack the new line of resistance but was met with accurate and devastating artillery fire and the stubborn resistance of infantry units failed to penetrate the line. He ordered a complete withdrawal to regroup and request for reinforcements. Corps Artillery consisted of 301st Field Artillery and 86th Field Artillery Battalion who emplacement was near Limay wreak havoc to the invaders.

=== Surrender ===
After new reinforcements arrived for General Homma and with more air and artillery fire powers, he planned and assaulted Bataan again. This time Japanese were successful and full retreat of II Corps troops towards south. General King with no other choice but surrender his troops. 301st Field Artillery surrendered and became prisoners of war. The regiment never reactivated by the Philippine Army after the war.
