= 301st Armored Cavalry Regiment =

- Active: 1949–1950
- Country: United States
- Branch: United States Army
- Type: Cavalry
- Role: Reconnaissance
- Garrison/HQ: Atlanta

The 301st Armored Cavalry Regiment (301st ACR) was a Georgia-based reconnaissance unit of the United States Army Organized Reserve Corps, which briefly existed after World War II. Constituted in 1948, it was partially organized in 1949 before being disbanded in 1950.

== History ==
The 301st Armored Cavalry was constituted on 21 October 1948 in the Organized Reserve Corps, and partially organized from existing units on 25 April 1949. Its headquarters and headquarters company (HHC) was redesignated from the headquarters and headquarters troop of the 301st Cavalry Group, Mechanized, which had been constituted on 17 October 1946 in the Organized Reserve and activated on 28 October of that year in Atlanta.

The regiment was disbanded on 1 September 1950, and its HHC became the HHC of the 301st Armor Group. In 1954, the 301st was commanded by Colonel Percy H. Perkins. The 301st ACR did not inherit the lineage of the prewar 301st Cavalry Regiment, and was not authorized a coat of arms or distinctive unit insignia.
