= 304th Armored Cavalry Regiment =

- Active: 1948–1950
- Country: United States
- Branch: United States Army
- Type: Cavalry
- Role: Reconnaissance
- Garrison/HQ: Boston

The 304th Armored Cavalry Regiment (304th ACR) was a Massachusetts-based reconnaissance unit of the United States Army Organized Reserve Corps, which briefly existed after World War II. It was constituted in 1948 and partially organized from existing units before being inactivated in 1950 and disbanded in 1952.

== History ==
The 304th Armored Cavalry was constituted on 21 October 1948 in the Organized Reserve Corps, and partially organized from existing units. Its headquarters and headquarters company (HHC) was redesignated from the headquarters and headquarters troop of the 304th Cavalry Group, which had been constituted on 7 October 1946 in the Organized Reserve and activated on 1 November of that year in Boston.

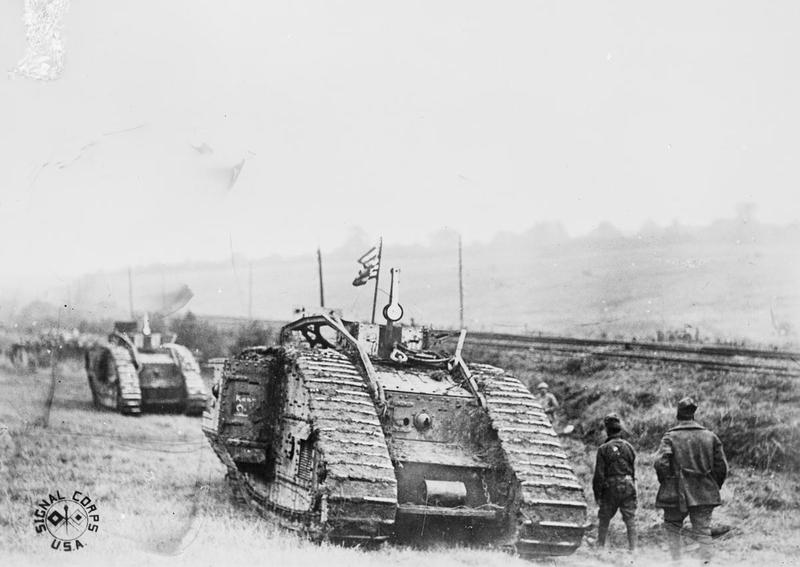
301st Tank Battalion Mark V (Male) tank going into action, October 1917

The regiment's 1st Battalion was redesignated from the 321st Mechanized Cavalry Squadron, which had been first constituted as the 1st Separate Battalion, Heavy Tank Service, 65th Engineers during World War I. It was organized on 17 September 1918 at Camp Upton, New York, and redesignated the 1st Heavy Tank Battalion on 18 March 1918. The unit was redesignated the 41st Heavy Battalion, Tanks on 9 April, and the 301st Tank Battalion on 11 June. The 301st fought in the Somme Offensive later that year.

On 22 June 1921 it was renumbered the 17th Tank Battalion, and became the 2nd Battalion of the 2nd Tank Regiment on 1 September 1929. Inactivated on 15 September 1931, it was redesignated the 2nd Battalion, 67th Infantry Regiment (Medium Tanks) on 31 October 1932. The battalion was activated by elements between 1 October 1939 and 5 June 1940 at Fort Benning, where the regiment became the 67th Armored Regiment on 15 July 1940. The 2/67th Armored served with the 2nd Armored Division during World War II, fighting in Operation Torch, the Tunisian Campaign, the Allied invasion of Sicily, the Normandy Campaign, the Northern France Campaign, the Rhineland Campaign, the Ardennes-Alsace Campaign, and the Central Europe Campaign. The battalion was disbanded on 25 March 1946 after the end of World War II, but reconstituted in the Organized Reserves on 6 February 1947 as the 321st Mechanized Cavalry Squadron, and activated on 21 February 1947 at Boston.

In March 1950, the regimental commander was Lieutenant Colonel Costas L. Caraganis. It spent the 1950 summer training period at Pine Camp, New York. The regiment's HHC became the 304th Armored Cavalry Group's HHC on 31 July 1950. At the same time, the 1st Battalion was inactivated at Boston. On 17 August the 1st Battalion became the 57th Tank Battalion, and the 2nd and 3rd Battalions were disbanded on 17 July 1952. The 304th ACR did not inherit the lineage of the prewar 304th Cavalry Regiment, and was not authorized a coat of arms or distinctive unit insignia.
