= 302nd Armored Cavalry Regiment =

- Active: 1948–1950
- Country: United States
- Branch: United States Army
- Type: Cavalry
- Role: Reconnaissance
- Garrison/HQ: Brooklyn

The 302nd Armored Cavalry Regiment (302nd ACR) was a New York-based reconnaissance unit of the United States Army Organized Reserve Corps, which briefly existed after World War II. Constituted in 1948, it was partially organized later that year and inactivated in 1950.

== History ==
The 302nd Armored Cavalry was constituted on 21 October 1948 in the Organized Reserve Corps, and partially organized from existing units on 10 November. Its headquarters and headquarters company (HHC) was redesignated from the headquarters and headquarters troop of the 302nd Mechanized Cavalry Group, which had been constituted on 7 October 1946 in the Organized Reserve and activated on 1 November of that year in Brooklyn.

The regiment's 1st Battalion was redesignated from the 325th Mechanized Cavalry Squadron, which had been first constituted on 3 December 1941 as the 654th Tank Destroyer Battalion and activated on 15 December 1941 at Fort Benning after the United States entered World War II. The 654th fought in the Normandy Campaign, the Northern France Campaign, the Rhineland Campaign, the Ardennes-Alsace Campaign, and the Central Europe Campaign during the war. It was equipped with the M10 tank destroyer until conversion to the M36 tank destroyer in February 1945. Postwar, it was inactivated on Camp Patrick Henry, Virginia, on 13 November 1945. It was redesignated as the 325th Mechanized Cavalry Squadron in the Organized Reserve on 10 April 1947 and activated two weeks later at Brooklyn.

The regiment was inactivated on 31 July 1950. The 1st Battalion became the 654th Tank Battalion on 10 March 1952, when the regiment was disbanded. The 302nd ACR did not inherit the lineage of the prewar 302nd Cavalry Regiment, and was not authorized a coat of arms or distinctive unit insignia.
