= Camp Stanley (Texas) =

U.S. Army facility in Texas

Coordinates: 29.6954°N 98.6213°W

Camp Stanley is a U.S. Army facility located at the Leon Springs Military Reservation, twenty miles northwest of downtown San Antonio near Fair Oaks Ranch, Texas.

== History ==
In 1906 and 1907, an area of about 17,000 acres near Leon Springs, just north of San Antonio, was acquired by the military as a training ground and firing range. In 1917, the area was named Camp Funston in honor of Maj. Gen. Frederick Funston but was redesignated Camp Stanley to avoid confusion with Camp Funston in Kansas. Camp Stanley is named after Brig. Gen. David S. Stanley, a Medal of Honor recipient during the Civil War and a former Commander of the Department of Texas.

The camp was used as a training ground during World War I and hosted the First Officers’ Training Camp and later the 57th Infantry Regiment, which included then Lt. Dwight D. Eisenhower. In 1917, an additional 16,000 acres were leased, and a new camp was established called Camp Bullis. Together, Camp Stanley and Camp Bullis became the Leon Spring Military Reservation.

Today, Camp Bullis serves as a training base for Army, Air Force, and Marine units, while Camp Stanley is used for munitions storage and testing.

CSSA is a Government-Owned, Government-Operated (GOGO) facility.

== Land transfers ==
After World War II, several land transfers occurred: In 1953 about 2,040 acres, the majority of the outer cantonment of present-day Camp Stanley, were transferred from Camp Bullis to the Camp Stanley Storage Activity (CSSA). In 1949 CSSA had become assigned to the Red River (Arsenal) Army Depot near Texarkana, Texas, as a support facility. In 1970 an additional 204 acres were transferred to Camp Stanley. According to a US Army document of 2005, "The primary mission of CSSA is receipt, storage, and issuance of ordnance material as well as quality assurance testing of military weapons and ammunition. A secondary mission, weapons training and qualifying also occurs at CSSA."

== Sources ==
- Manguso, John M. (1990). Camp Bullis: Admirably Suited to All Purposes of Military Training: A History of the Leon Springs Military Reservation, 1890-1990. San Antonio, Texas: Fort Sam Houston Museum. OCLC 25665465.
