= Spruce Production Division =

- Division soldiers posing on a spruce stump
- Active: 1917–1918
- Country: United States
- Branch: United States Army
- Size: 28,825 workers

Commanders
- Notable commanders: Colonel Brice P. Disque

Insignia
- Signal Corps

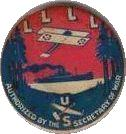
- Spruce Production Division

The Spruce Production Division was a unit of the United States Army established in 1917 to produce high-quality Sitka spruce timber and other wood products needed to make aircraft for the United States' efforts in World War I. The division was part of the Army Signal Corps's Aviation Section. Its headquarters were in Portland, Oregon, and its main operations center was at Vancouver Barracks in Vancouver, Washington. Workers in the division were members of the Loyal Legion of Loggers and Lumbermen, a union specifically established to support the army's wood production operations.

The division produced nearly 150 million board feet (350,000 m^{3}) of spruce in just 15 months, halting work almost as soon as the war ended. Col. Brice Disque was then put on trial for accusations that he had wasted millions of tax dollars. He was found not guilty of malfeasance.

The division had a large impact on logging in the Pacific Northwest. Logging companies adopted working conditions similar to those the division had, and they took advantage of new logging roads and rail lines that the division had built to access more timber.

== Activation ==
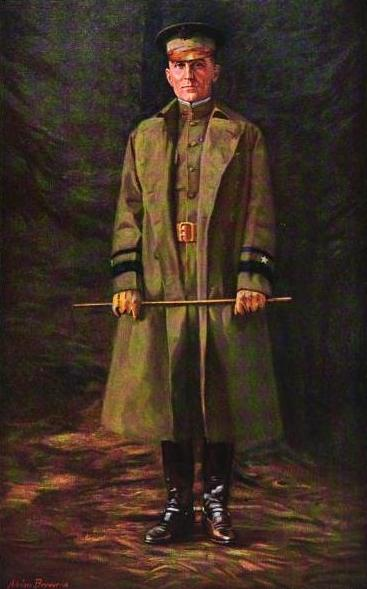
Colonel Brice P. Disque

From the beginning of World War I, wood products were in great demand for war production. Sitka spruce was the most important tree species because its combination of lightness, strength, and resiliency was ideal for aircraft production. In addition, its long, tough fibers did not splinter when struck by bullets. Even before the United States entered the war, the Pacific Northwest had become the main supplier of spruce for aircraft production in Great Britain, France, and Italy. Northwest lumber mills, however, were never able to meet Europe's demand for spruce. The government wanted a monthly production of 10 million board feet (24,000 m^{3}) of spruce, but before the division was activated, only 2 million board feet (4,700 m^{3}) were produced monthly.

When the United States entered the war in 1917, General John J. Pershing sent Brice P. Disque, a former army captain, to the Pacific Northwest to determine if local labor issues within the forest products industry could be quickly resolved. Disque met with mill owners and representatives of the Industrial Workers of the World, the union that was trying to organize loggers and sawmill workers in the Pacific Northwest. After studying the situation for several months, Disque determined that the long-standing labor management dispute could not be resolved without direct intervention by the army. Based on Disque's report, the United States Army Signal Corps was given the job of reorganizing the forest products industry in the Pacific Northwest to support United States war production.

On 29 September 1917, Disque was brought back into the army as a lieutenant colonel and was assigned to develop plans for an army unit to produce wood products for the war effort. On 6 November, Disque was promoted to colonel and given command of the newly formed Spruce Production Division, a part of the United States Army Signal Corps. The headquarters of the new unit were in Downtown Portland, which was "the centre of the great spruce area of the Pacific Northwest," while the division's induction, training, and operations center was established at Vancouver Barracks across the Columbia River in Vancouver, Washington, where it employed about 19,000 soldiers.

== Production ==
The division produced a varied number of board feet of spruce each month.

Originally, the Spruce Production Division was authorized to induct 10,317 troops, including both officers and enlisted men. The Spruce Production Division quickly recruited several thousand experienced loggers and mill workers, many of whom were above the military draft age of 40. In May 1918, the division was authorized to grow to 28,825 personnel.

Initially, both the mill owners and local unions were against the army's takeover of lumber production. The mill owners disliked having the army overseeing their businesses, and the unions saw soldiers' labor as a form of strikebreaking. Disque, however, called on everyone to support war production. He was also careful not to favor either owners or unions as he increased production, helping both sides achieve their goals. For the mill owners, military manpower kept mills open and running at full capacity; in addition, it prevented radicals from sabotaging facilities or equipment. The unions benefited because military rules stabilized wages and improved working conditions for loggers and sawmill workers throughout the Pacific Northwest. Among the improved conditions was a standard eight-hour day.

To counter the influence of union radicals in the Industrial Workers of the World, Disque sponsored an alternative union based on patriotism and labor–management cooperation. The new union, the Loyal Legion of Loggers and Lumbermen, was established in 1917 and put under the leadership of Portland attorney Captain Maurice E. Crumpacker, who would later serve as a U.S. Congressman. The union was initially opposed by both labor and mill owners, but due to Disque's strong advocacy, within six months nearly all of the mill owners had agreed to support the union; by October 1918, it had 125,000 members. In fact, the union lasted 20 years longer than the Spruce Production Division.

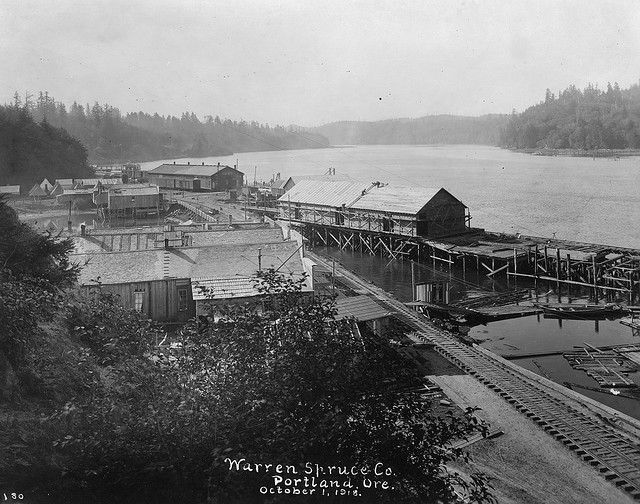
Spruce logs were often transported via railroad.

The Spruce Production Division established approximately 60 military logging camps throughout the Pacific Northwest, usually near existing sawmills. While privately owned, these mills were operated under the direction of the army. On 20 December 1917, Disque reported that the division was only meeting 40 percent of the demand for spruce. He said that the production must be increased from 3 million board feet (7,100 m^{3}) to 11 million board feet (26,000 m^{3}) to meet the demand. In early 1918, the division opened a sawmill at Vancouver Barracks, the largest spruce sawmill in the world, "producing more than one million feet of spruce lumber each day." The mill complex covered 50 acres (20 ha) and was operated by 2,400 soldiers from the division. The army also built sawmills in Coquille and Toledo, Oregon, and in Port Angeles, Washington. A 3,000-worker community in Washington was designed as a company town by architect Carl F. Gould. The 0.5-square-mile (1.3 km^{2}) townsite was laid out with bunkhouses, and with dining and recreation halls styled after Adirondack lodges. The division also built 13 railroads with over 130 miles (210 km) of track to link logging areas to sawmills. At the peak of construction, there were 10,000 soldiers building railroads in Oregon and Washington forests. All wire rope manufactured in the west, as well as anything shipped in, was controlled by the spruce division per Colonel Disque. As the Los Angeles Times reported in February 1918, "There was a serious shortage of wire rope when Col. Disque took charge of the spruce production campaign."

The division lasted only 15 months, during which it produced a total of 143,008,961 board feet (337,463.57 m^{3}) of spruce. It produced nearly 54 million board feet (130,000 m^{3}) for aircraft construction from Oregon forests alone. Before the Pacific Northwest began logging spruce for the war, much of the lumber came from the eastern United States, where production amounted to just 15 percent of demand. Logging techniques in the east were not as advanced or as efficient with wood.

The network of roads and railroads that the division had built allowed for future development of the forests, which facilitated the growth of the lumber industry in the Pacific Northwest for the remainder of the 20th century.

== Demobilization ==
Lt. Col. Cuthbert P. Stearns, Chief of Staff of the Spruce Production Division, US Army.

The armistice that ended World War I was signed on 11 November 1918. The next day, all Spruce Production Division logging ended, most construction projects were stopped, and sawmill operations were curtailed. Government machinery and equipment from all over the Northwest was shipped back to Vancouver Barracks, and division personnel were quickly discharged from military service. Over $12 million worth of logging equipment, sawmill machinery, and other property was eventually sold in a government auction.

While the Spruce Production Division was quickly demobilized after the war, there was some post-war controversy over the cost of its operations. Disque, by then a brigadier general, spent months answering to charges that his division had wasted taxpayers' money. Congress was particularly critical of the $4 million spent on an unfinished railroad located in the Olympic Peninsula of Washington. Disque responded that it was to be used for transporting spruce lumber. Eventually, the charges proved to be unfounded.

Disque was discharged from the army in March 1919 to be "appointed chairman of the export and import branch of the American International Corporation with headquarters at New York."

== Legacy ==
Lt. Col. Cuthbert Stearns compiled a history of the Spruce Production Division, The Spruce Production Division, United States Army and Spruce Production Corporation, that was published in 1919. This detailed record of the division's operations helped General Disque defend the cost of spruce production in his debate with members of Congress. The U.S. National Archives in Seattle holds approximately 187 cubic feet (5.3 m^{3}) of records related to the division, as well as "a complete roster of all military personnel in the Spruce Production Division as of 1 November 1918."

The effects of the Spruce Production Division continued long after the unit was demobilized. Not only did the division dramatically increase the production of forest products for the war effort, but the transportation network that it built helped open up Pacific Northwest forests to greater use in the decades that followed. In addition, the division's work rules became the standard for logging and sawmill operations throughout the Pacific Northwest well into the 1930s.
