= 101st Cavalry Regiment =

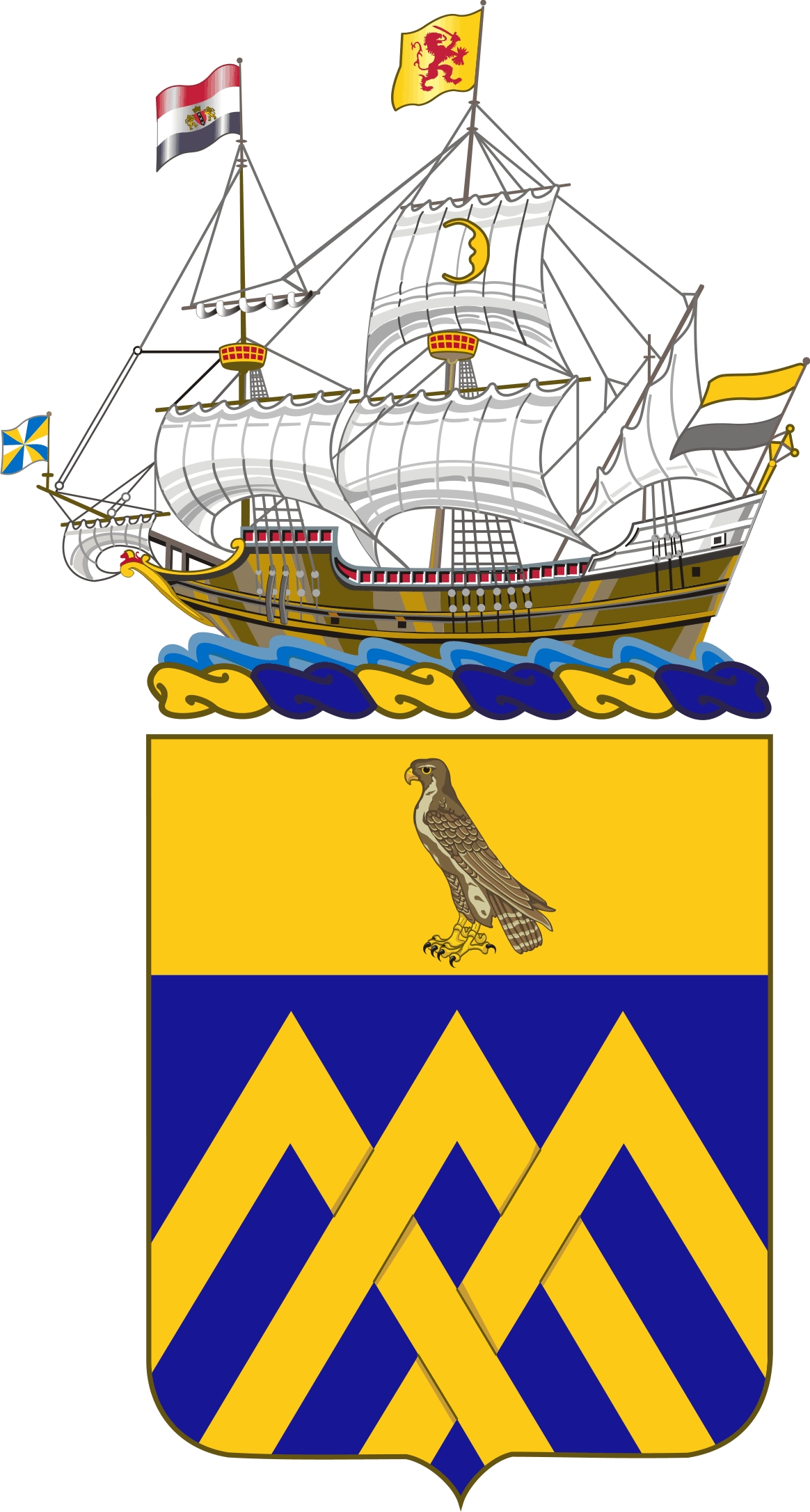
- 101st Cavalry Regt coat of arms
- Active: 1838-Present
- Country: United States
- Allegiance: New York
- Branch: New York Army National Guard
- Size: 350px
- Nicknames: Wingfoot, Guardian
- Motto: To The Utmost
- Branch color: Yellow
- Engagements: American Civil War; Spanish–American War; Mexican Border Conflict; World War I World War II; War in Afghanistan

Commanders
- Squadron Commander: LTC Gary L Barney
- Command Sergeant Major: CSM Jon Cross

Insignia
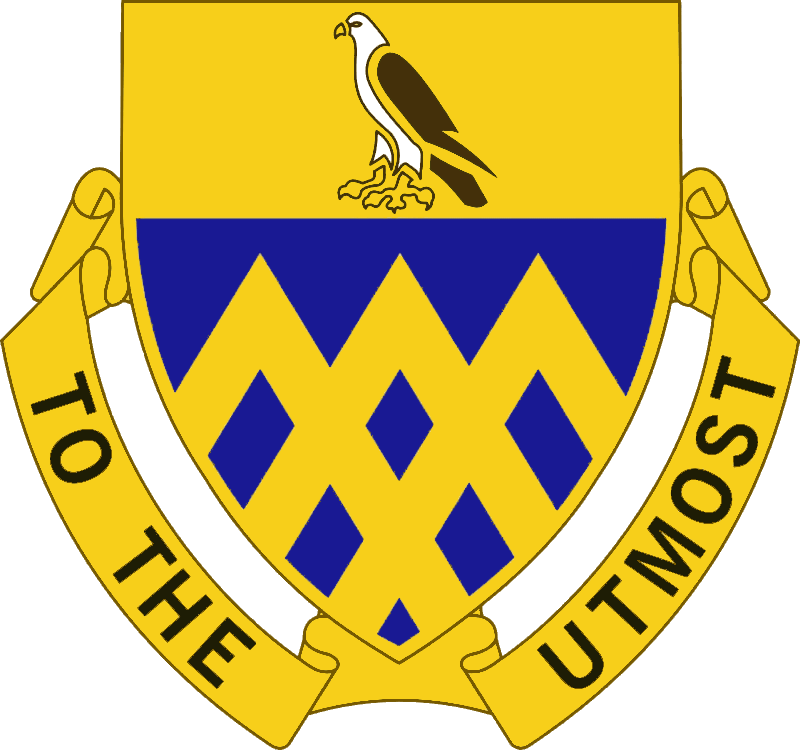
- Distinctive Unit Insignia

This page is about the 101st Cavalry Regiment. The 101st Cavalry Group was its headquarters unit.

The 101st Cavalry Regiment is a unit of the New York National Guard that has seen service in the American Civil War, the Spanish–American War, the Mexican Border Conflict, World War I, World War II, and the War in Afghanistan. It also carries the lineage of the former 1st Battalion, 127th Armored Regiment (originally founded in 1838), and 1st Battalion, 210th Armor (originally founded in 1860). Currently, the regiment consists of one squadron, the 2nd Squadron, 101st Cavalry.

== History ==
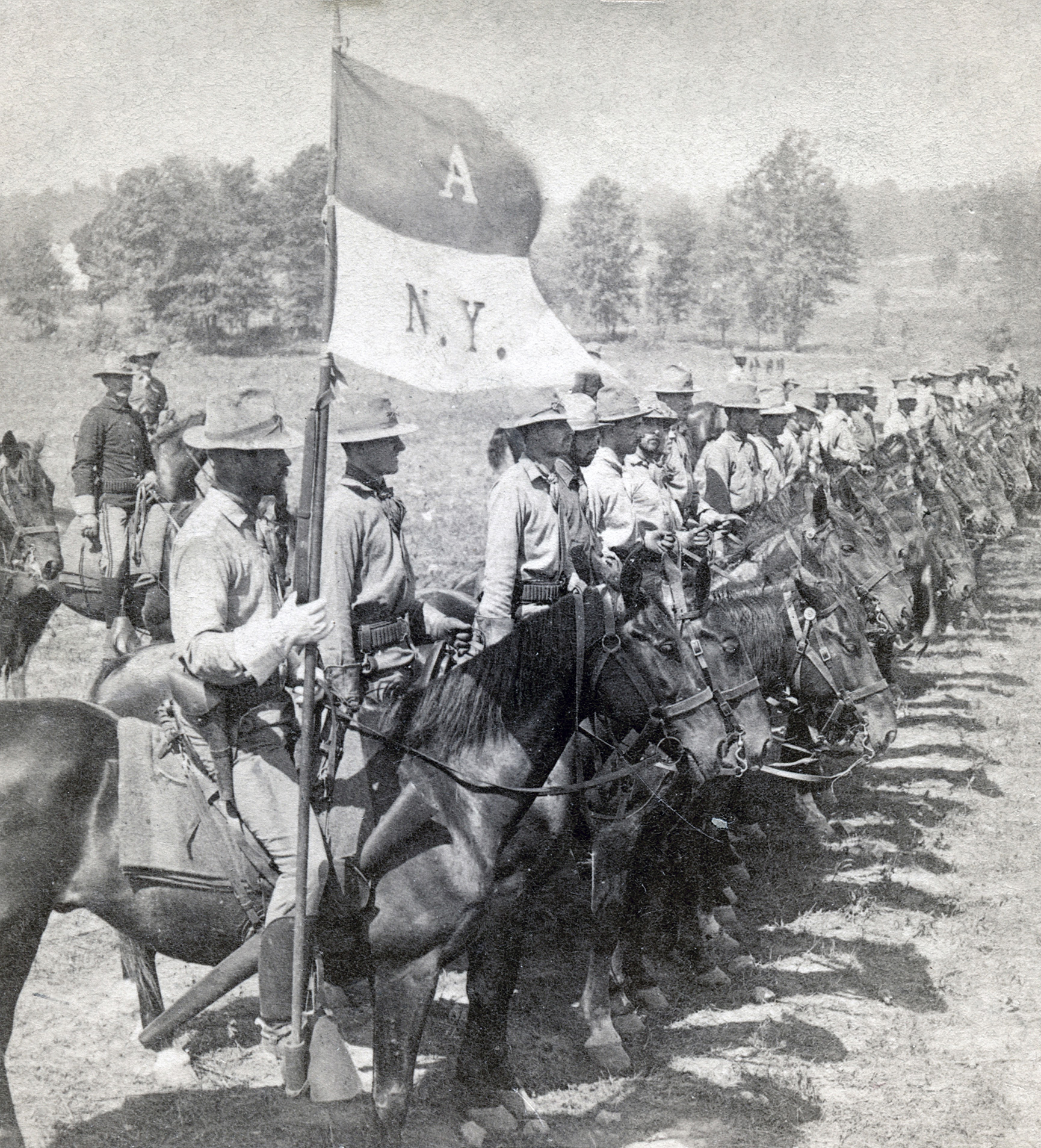
Troop A, Volunteer Cavalry from New York City, Camp Alger, Virginia 1898

=== World War I ===
During World War I, the 1st New York Cavalry was broken up and assigned as various elements of the 27th Division: twenty-one officers and 706 enlisted men (parts of the Headquarters, Headquarters Troop, Supply Troop, and Troop F, two officers from Troop K and one from Troop L, and the entirety of the Machine Gun Troop and Troops A, B, C, D, and M) were assigned to the 104th Machine Gun Battalion; fourteen officers and 549 men (parts of the Headquarters, Headquarters Troop, Supply Troop, Troop F, Troop K less two officers, Troop L less one officer, and the entirety of Troops E, G, and H) were assigned to the 106th Machine Gun Battalion; nine officers and twenty-nine men from the Headquarters were assigned to the 102nd Ammunition Train; three officers and 181 men (including Troop I) were assigned to the 102nd Trench Mortar Battery; the remaining thirty men were assigned to the 105th Machine Gun Battalion.

=== Interwar period ===
The 101st Cavalry Regiment was constituted in the National Guard on 30 December 1920, assigned to the 21st Cavalry Division, and allotted to the state of New York. It was organized on 1 June 1921 by redesignation of the 1st New York Cavalry Regiment as the 101st Cavalry. The regimental headquarters was organized on 11 July 1921 and federally recognized at Brooklyn. Subordinate squadron headquarters were organized and federally recognized as follows: 1st Squadron organized on 6 June 1921 at Brooklyn; 2nd Squadron organized on 1 June 1921 at Buffalo. The entire 2nd Squadron was reassigned on 15 February 1928 as part of the new 121st Cavalry Regiment, and a new 2nd Squadron organized from the 51st Machine Gun Squadron at Manhattan. Reorganized on 25 May 1929 as a three-squadron regiment, with the new 3rd Squadron organized at Manhattan. The 2nd Squadron participated in a review on 7 June 1930 for Governor Franklin D. Roosevelt at Van Cortlandt Park in the Bronx. The regiment provided escort to Prince and Princess Takamatsu of Japan on 11 April 1931 during their visit to New York City. The regiment conducted summer training at Fort Ethan Allen, Vermont, from 1921–25 (less 1923), Camp Dix, New Jersey, in 1923, and Pine Camp, New York, from 1926–39, and conducted additional week-long winter training directed by the War Department at Plattsburg Barracks, New York, in December 1939. The regiment was reorganized and redesignated as the 101st Cavalry Regiment (Horse and Mechanized) on 1 October 1940 and relieved from the 21st Cavalry Division. It was assigned to the VI Corps on 30 December 1940. It was inducted into active federal service at home stations on 27 January 1941 and transferred to Fort Devens, Massachusetts, arriving there on 4 February 1941.

=== World War II ===
In 1943, the regiment was reorganized into the:

- 101st Cavalry Reconnaissance Squadron (Mechanized), the former 1st Squadron
- 116th Cavalry Reconnaissance Squadron (Mechanized), the former 2nd Squadron
- 101st Cavalry Group (Mechanized), its headquarters unit, the former regimental headquarters troop

With this organization, the group saw combat in northwest Europe during World War II with the XV and the XXI Corps of the U.S. Seventh Army in the Sixth Army Group. Late in the war it was attached to the 12th Armored Division of XXI Corps.

Among other exploits, troops of the 101st Cavalry captured German field marshal Albert Kesselring as well as the Japanese ambassador to Germany in May 1945. Following the war, the 101st Group was inactivated on 25 October 1945 at Camp Myles Standish, Massachusetts.

=== Post-War ===
The regiment was reformed as the 101st Armored Cavalry Regiment on 1 January 1950 with headquarters again at Brooklyn. On 16 March 1959, the unit was retitled the 101st Armored Regiment, which endured until 15 April 1963 when the unit was renamed the 101st Cavalry, reduced in strength to one squadron, and subordinated to the 42nd Infantry Division.Pope, pp. 13–15

In 1993, the 101st was consolidated with the 1st Battalion, 210th Armor, taking the 210th's lineage and battle honors but keeping its designation as the 101st Cavalry. The 1st squadron of the 101st Cavalry was disbanded in August 2006.

The 2nd Squadron remains, and is headquartered in Niagara Falls, New York. 2nd Squadron is the reconnaissance squadron of the 27th IBCT, and they consist of A Troop (Mounted) stationed in Geneva, New York, B Troop (Mounted), and C Troop (Dismounted). The 2nd Squadron also carries the lineage of the 1st Battalion, 127th Armor Regiment, which converted into the 2nd Squadron, 101st Cavalry when the New York National Guard reorganized in 2005–2006. The squadron deployed to Afghanistan in 2008 and again in 2012. The Squadron, with additional support from the 27th IBCT, deployed to Ukraine in 2017 in order to support the training of Ukrainian soldiers. Elements of the Squadron deployed to Germany and Horn of Africa in 2022.

=== Unit Commendations ===
- Meritorious Unit Commendation - 2005 - Iraq
- Philippine Unit Commendation - 1945 - Philippines

== Reading ==
- Clay, Steven E., U.S. Army Order of Battle 1919-1941 (Vol. 2), Fort Leavenworth: Combat Studies Institute Press, 2010.
- Pope, Jeffrey L. and Kondratiuk, Leonid E., Armor-Cavalry Regiments, Washington: National Guard Bureau, 1995.
