= Second Corps Area =

- Active: 20 August 1920–7 December 1941
- Country: United States of America
- Branch: United States Army
- Type: Training
- Role: Military District
- Part of: Department of War
- Garrison/HQ: Governor's Island, NY

Second Corps Area was a Corps Area of the United States Army, active from 20 August 1920 to 7 December 1941. Its headquarters was located at Fort Jay at Governors Island in New York city. Its staff also served as the First Army Area headquarters staff. It covered the states of New York, New Jersey, and Delaware plus the island of Puerto Rico. At its height in 1943, the command had 50,749 soldiers.

It was established in accordance with the National Defense Act of 1920.

Second Corps Area replaced the Eastern Department, headquartered at Fort Jay on Governors Island in New York City and encompassed New York, New Jersey, Delaware and from 1921 to 1937, the District of Puerto Rico.

The Second Corps Area Training Center was established in 1931 at Fort Slocum, New York and was transferred to Camp Dix, New Jersey 30 December 1921 and finally to Fort Jay, New York until 25 October 1922. The training area was responsible for annual summer training of regular army, organized reserves, R.O.T.C. and the C.M.T.C.

Formations included the First Army (1921–36 and 1938–41); Fourth Army (1921–33); the II Corps, with the 1st Infantry Division, the only active division in the area; the 27th Infantry Division of the New York National Guard; and the 44th Infantry Division of the New Jersey, New York, and Delaware National Guards; and XII Corps, assigned the 77th Division, 78th Division, and 98th Division of the Organized Reserves.

Also in the corps area was the 21st Cavalry Division of the New York, Pennsylvania, Rhode Island, and New Jersey National Guards; the 61st Cavalry Division of the Organized Reserves, including two cavalry brigades; the Second Coast Artillery District; and the Second Corps Area Service Command.

With the adoption of the four field army plan on 1 October 1933, the mobile units of the Second Corps Area were reassigned to the First Army or GHQ Reserve, or were demobilized.

"The Puerto Rican Department was established by the War Department in May 1939 to assume the responsibility, previously that of the Second Corps Area, for the defense of the Puerto Rico area and for conducting Corps Area administrative, intelligence, training, supply, and other Army services, including the administration of National Guard affairs, in Puerto Rico. On June 1, 1943, the Puerto Rican Department was renamed the Antilles Department.

Second Corps Area provided supplies for the Newfoundland Base Command from 1941.

General Hugh A. Drum, Commanding General of the First Army, retired in 1943 when he reached the mandatory retirement age. General George Grunert, commander of the Second Service Command, assumed command of the First Army until Headquarters, First Army was activated in Bristol, England in January 1944 under the command of General Omar Bradley.

== Commanders ==
Second Corps Area

- Major General Robert L. Bullard (20 August 1920–15 January 1925)
- Major General Charles P. Summerall (16 January 1925–20 November 1926)
- Brigadier General Hugh A. Drum (20 November 1926–8 January 1927)
- Major General James H. McRae (8 January 1927–1 December 1927)
- Major General Hanson E. Ely (1 December 1927–30 November 1931)
- Major General Dennis E. Nolan (31 November 1931–30 April 1936)
- Major General Frank R. McCoy (1 May 1936–30 July 1938)
- Brigadier General Evan H. Humphrey (30 July 1938–5 November 1938)
- Lieutenant General Hugh A. Drum (5 November 1938–December 1940)
- Major General Irving J. Phillipson (December 1940–15 May 1942)

Second Service Command

- Major General Thomas A. Terry (1 May 1942–22 September 1945)
- General Jonathan M. Wainwright IV (September 1945-January 1946)
