= Fort Ethan Allen =

- Fort Ethan Allen Historic District
- U.S. National Register of Historic Places
- U.S. Historic district
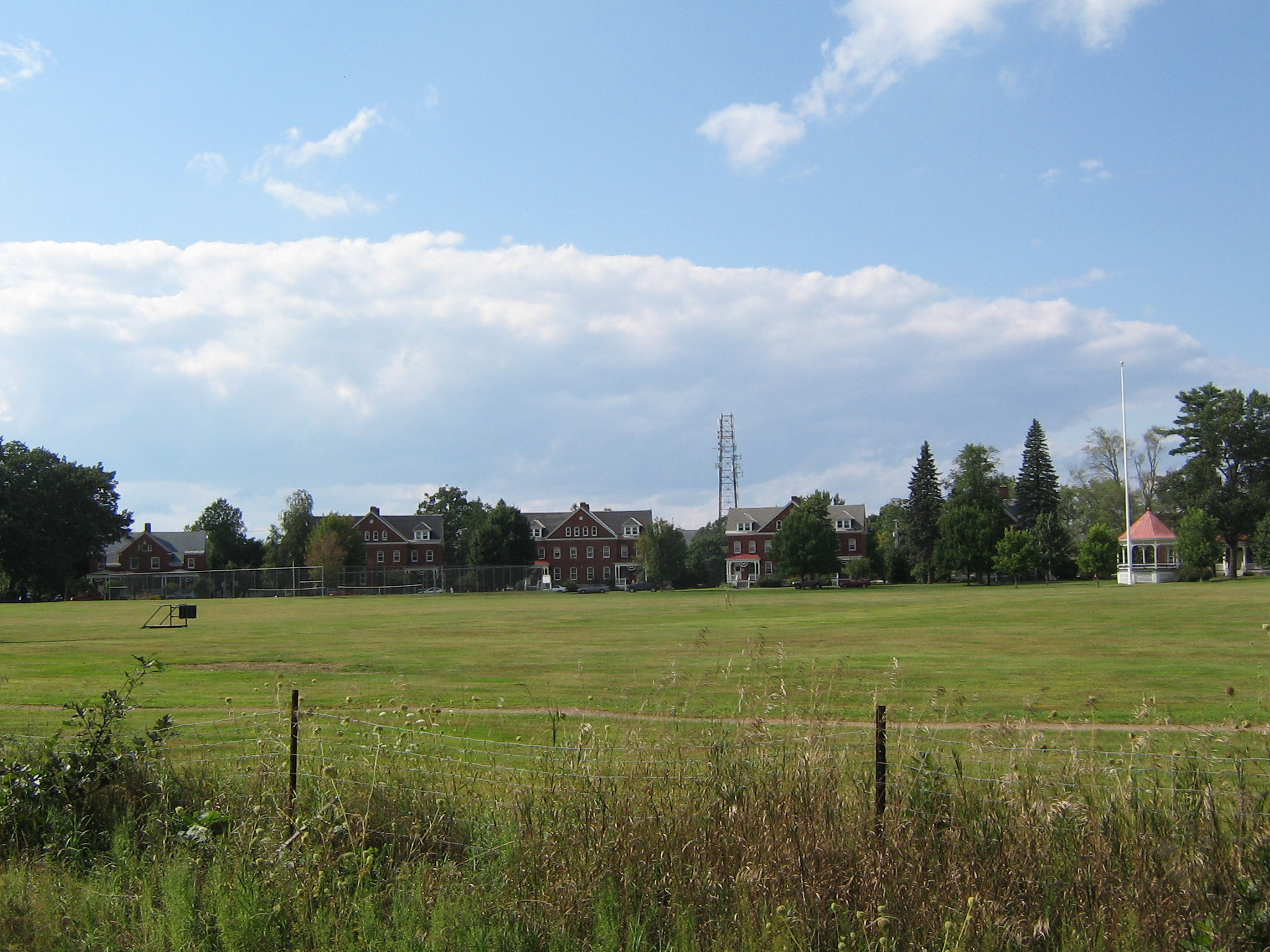
- The Parade Ground and historic Officers Row buildings

- Location within Vermont Location within the United States
- Location: Jct. of VT 15 and Barnes Ave., Colchester and Essex, Vermont
- Coordinates: 44°30′20″N 73°9′1″W
- Area: 138 acres (56 ha)
- Built: 1894
- Built by: US Army
- Architectural style: Colonial Revival, Queen Anne, Romanesque
- NRHP reference No.: 95001102
- Added to NRHP: September 14, 1995

Fort Ethan Allen was a United States Army installation in Vermont, named for American Revolutionary War figure Ethan Allen. Established as a cavalry post in 1894 and closed in 1944, today it is the center of a designated national historic district straddling the town line between Colchester and Essex. Locally, it is known simply as "The Fort", and now houses a Vermont National Guard installation and a variety of businesses, academic institutions, and residential areas.

== Description ==
The former grounds of Fort Ethan Allen stand on the north side of Vermont Route 15, roughly divided in half between southeastern Colchester and southwestern Essex. The grounds are organized around a large elliptical parade ground located just north of the main road, with circulation in the former base complex provided by series of concentric roadways joined by shorter segments radiating away from the parade ground. The grounds are more than 130 acres (53 ha), and include a variety of former military buildings, in some places now including post-military construction. Fronting the parade ground along Dalton Drive are houses that originally served as officer housing, and the fort's main administration building. Barracks, former cavalry stables, and other types of service buildings line the roads further out from the parade ground. A cluster of buildings at the far eastern end of the property includes one that has been converted into a museum recounting the fort's history. Its original buildings were built in the then-popular Colonial Revival style, which was largely continued in later construction at the base.

== History ==
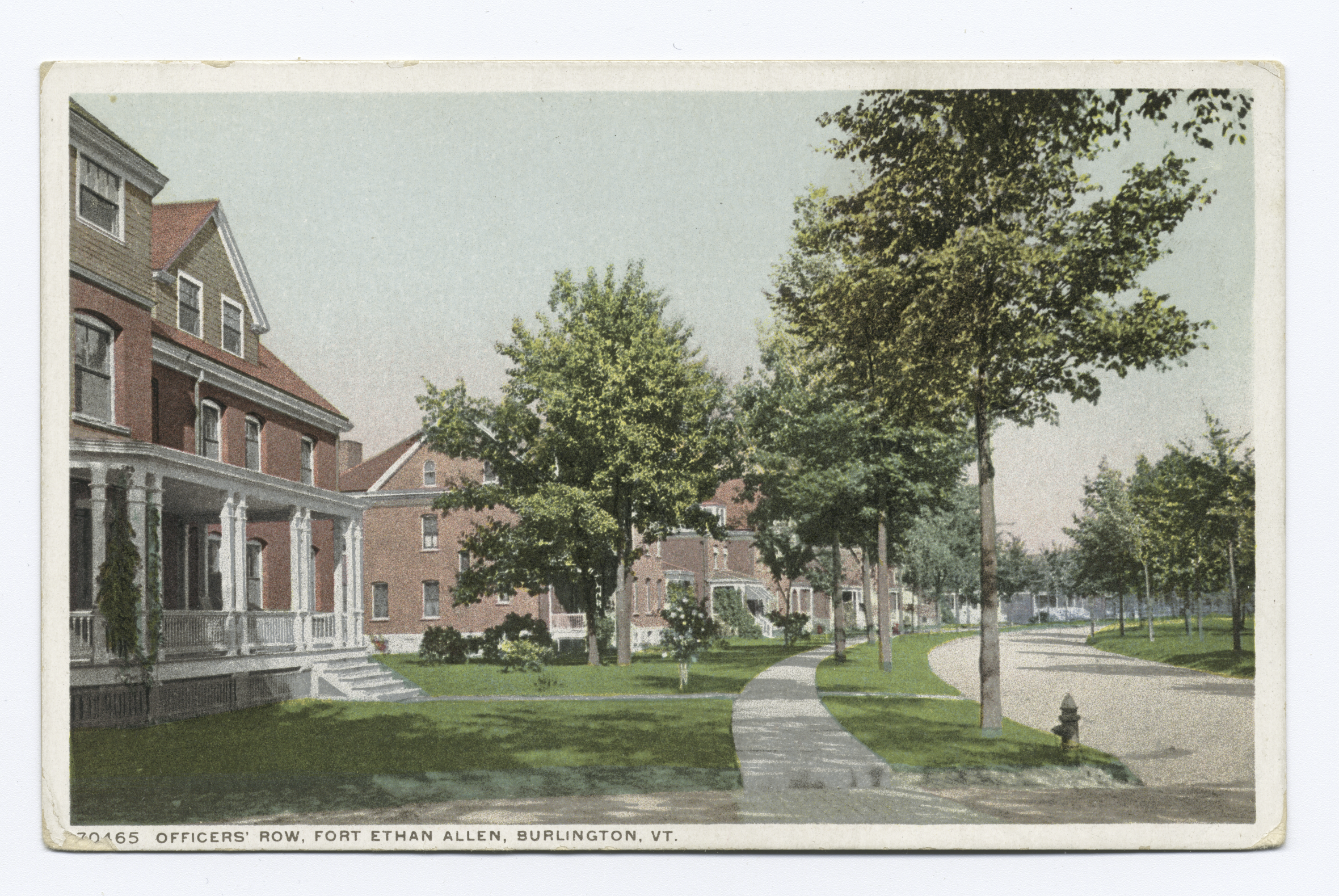
Officers Row, early 20th century

Fort Ethan Allen was authorized by Congress in 1892, which had decided that some measure of permanent defense should be established in the vicinity of the Canada–United States border. It was built on former farmland donated to the federal government, and its buildings were constructed using locally sourced materials.

The fort was home to the 10th Cavalry Regiment (from 1909 to 1913); 1st Battalion 77th Field Artillery Regiment; 1st Squadron, 3rd Cavalry (from 1919 to 1941); the 7th Field Artillery, less 2nd Battalion (from 1922 to 1940); the 3rd Battalion, 13th Infantry (from 1928 to 1931); the 2nd Battalion, 7th Field Artillery (from 1933 to 1940); as well as elements of 9th Quartermaster Regiment, and the 84th Quartermaster Battalion.

When the 10th Cavalry departed Vermont in 1913, many of its members retired and remained in the area. As a result, many of their descendants still reside in Colchester, Winooski and Burlington.

The post was deactivated by the Army in 1944. Part of it was used to enlarge the campus of Saint Michael's College, parts of the post have been commercially developed, and part comprises Camp Johnson, the headquarters of the Vermont National Guard.

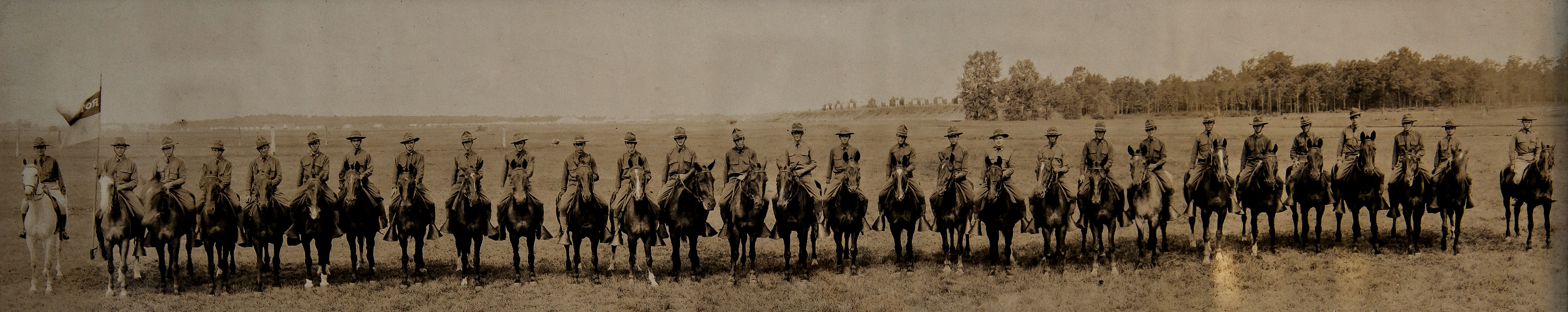
A row of ROTC Cavalry at the fort in 1931

While there are some newer structures on the original post (notably college housing and Vermont PBS), the original buildings are put to good use. Various businesses occupy what used to be horse barns; barracks have been converted to apartments, and the "Officers Row" houses are condominiums. An abandoned theater and church are often used for firefighting practice. The former base hospital is a nursing home. Despite all the activity, it is a quiet neighborhood with many families.

It includes an 80 feet (24 m) tall water tower, built in 1893 and the oldest structure of the fort. A campaign to raise money to renovate the tower so visitors may climb it is underway.

== See also ==
- Camp Ethan Allen Training Site, an active Vermont National Guard installation and location of the Army Mountain Warfare School
- National Register of Historic Places listings in Chittenden County, Vermont
