= 3rd Brigade, 104th Division =

Infantry brigade of the United States Army

- 1Shoulder sleeve insignia
- Active: 24 June 1921 – 20 December 1945; 1 December 1946 – Present
- Country: United States of America
- Branch: Army Reserve
- Type: Infantry Brigade
- Role: Training
- Size: Brigade
- Garrison/HQ: Fort Belvoir, Virginia
- Engagements: World War II; *Battle of Hurtgen Forest; *Battle of the Bulge

The 3rd Brigade, 104th Division is an infantry brigade of the United States Army. It is a training component of the United States Army Reserve, and subordinate to the 104th Division based in Fort Lewis, Washington. It is primarily responsible for combat support training for soldiers entering the Military Police, Civil Affairs, Combat Engineering, Chemical Corps, and Signal Corps.

== History ==
The 3rd Brigade traces its lineage to the 329th Engineer Battalion, which was originally assigned to the 104th Division.

At the outbreak of World War II, the 104th Division began preparing to participate in the war in Europe. The division was ordered into active military service on 15 September 1942 and reorganized as the 104th Infantry Division at Camp Adair, Oregon. The 207th and 208th Brigades did not reactivate as part of an army-wide elimination of brigade commands within its divisions. The division was instead centered on three infantry regiments; the 413th Infantry Regiment, the 414th Infantry Regiment, and the 415th Infantry Regiment. Also assigned to the division were the 385th, 386th, 387th and 929th Field Artillery Battalions, as well as the 104th Signal Company, the 804th Ordnance Company, the 104th Quartermaster Company, the 104th Reconnaissance Troop, the 329th Engineer Battalion, the 329th Medical Battalion, and the 104th Counter Intelligence Detachment. From that point it began training as a division in preparation for deployment to Europe. The division trained in the northwestern United States during the next two years, earning its name "Timberwolf Division" from its time in the area. The division was the first Army Division to train specifically for fighting in nighttime conditions.

=== Europe ===
The 104th Infantry Division sailed for Europe on 27 August 1944. It landed in France on 7 September 1944. In early October, Major General Terry de la Mesa Allen, Sr. took command of the division. He would command the division during most of its time in combat. The division was assigned to III Corps of the Ninth United States Army, Twelfth United States Army Group. The division then organized and assembled at Manche, France before heading into combat.

The division moved into defensive positions in the vicinity of Wuestwezel, Belgium on 23 October 1944. Three days later, it went on the offensive, taking Zundert, gaining control of the Breda-Roosendaal Road and overrunning Vaart Canal defenses. Leur and Etten fell as the division advanced to the Mark River, arriving there by 31 October. A coordinated attack over the Mark River at Standaarduiten on 2 November established a bridgehead and the rest of the division crossed the river. Zevenbergen was captured and the Meuse (Maas) was reached on 5 November. While the bulk of the division moved near Aachen, Germany, elements remained to secure Moerdijk until 7 November, when they were relieved. During this time, the division was reassigned to VII Corps of the First United States Army, also part of the Twelfth Army Group.

On 16 November, the division went on another offensive, taking Stolberg and pushing on against heavy resistance. Eschweiler fell on the 21st and the enemy was cleared from the area west of the Inde River, including Inden by 2 December. Lucherberg was held against enemy counterattacks on 3 December, and all strongholds west of the Roer River were captured by the 23d. It took temporary command of the 60th Infantry Regiment of the 9th Infantry Division. The 104th actively defended its sector near Duren and Merken from 15 December to 22 February. During that time it was reassigned to XIX Corps of the Ninth United States Army. It then moved across the Roer taking Huchem-Stammeln, Birkesdorf, and North Duren. On 5 March, after heavy fighting, it entered Köln. After defending the west bank of the Rhine River, the division crossed the river at Honnef on 22 March 1945, and attacked to the east of the Remagen bridgehead. During this time, some of the division's assets fell under command of the 1st Infantry Division and the 3rd Armored Division. After a period of mopping up and consolidation, it participated in the trap of enemy troops in the Ruhr pocket. The 104th repulsed heavy attacks near Medebach and captured Paderborn on 1 April 1945. After regrouping, it advanced to the east and crossed the Weser River on the 8th, blocking enemy exits from the Harz Mountains. The division then crossed the Saale River and took Halle in a bitter 5-day struggle from 15 to 19 April. The sector to the Mulde River was cleared by the 21st, and after vigorous patrolling, the Division contacted the Red Army at Pretzsch on 26 April. The division took temporary command of assets from the 69th Infantry Division in early May.

The division returned to the United States on 3 July 1945. Once back in states, it continued the process of demobilization until 20 December of that year, when it was deactivated.

=== Training Division ===
The division was reactivated on 1 December 1946 in the organized reserves in Portland, Oregon. It began taking on the responsibility of holding training programs for new soldiers of the US Army Reserve. In July 1948, the division held its first session of summer training. By the end of the training, it had turned out 300 new reservists. By 1952, the division was turning out 1,500 new reservists per training camp. The division was reorganized specifically as a training division in 1959. In 1961, the division was relocated to Vancouver Barracks, Washington.

In 1967, the division was reorganized around brigades, as part of an army wide initiative, the Reorganization Objective Army Division plan. The division's headquarters element was replaced with a larger and more versatile Headquarters and Headquarters Company. Its former World War II formations became brigades. The division's former headquarters element became 1st Brigade, 104th Division, activated at Vancouver Barracks. The 929th Field Artillery Battalion became the 2nd Brigade, 104th Division activated at Pasco, Washington. The 329th Engineer Battalion became the 3rd Brigade, 104th Division at Fort Lawton, Washington. The 804th Ordnance Battalion became the 4th Brigade, 104th Division, also at Fort Lawton. At this time, the army began consolidating its training units across the country, and as a result, the 104th Division took on missions of One Station Unit Training, Basic Combat Training, Advanced Individual Training, and Combat Support training. 3rd brigade took on combat support training, a role it continues to this day.

In the 1970s and 1980s, the brigade was organized with an Engineer battalion, a Signal battalion, a Chemical battalion, a Civil Affairs battalion, and a Military Intelligence battalion. In 2005, the Base Realignment and Closure suggestions included the closure of the Vancouver Barracks, and the 3rd Brigade, 104th Division was subsequently relocated to Fort Lewis, Washington, though its duties remained the same.

== Honors ==
=== Unit decorations ===
The brigade has never received an award from the United States Army.

=== Campaign streamers ===
| Conflict | Streamer | Year(s) |
|---|---|---|
| World War II | Rhineland | 1944–1945 |
| World War II | Ardennes-Alsace | 1944–1945 |
| World War II | Central Europe | 1945 |

== Sources ==
- McGrath, John J. (1 January 2004). The Brigade: A History: Its Organization and Employment in the US Army. Combat Studies Institute Press. ISBN 978-1-4404-4915-4.
- Wilson, John B. (1999). Armies, Corps, Divisions, and Separate Brigades. Department of the Army. ASIN B000OJKX1S.
- Army Almanac: A Book of Facts Concerning the Army of the United States. United States Government Printing Office. 1959. ASIN B0006D8NKK.
- Order of Battle of the United States Army: World War II European Theater of Operations. Department of the Army. April 1988. ISBN 978-0-16-001967-8.
