= 104th Training Division =

US Army training unit

- 104th Division insignia
- Active: 24 June 1921 – 20 December 1945 (Organized Reserve); 1 December 1946 – 10 June 1959 (Army Reserve); 10 June 1959 – 2026 (104th Training Div.)
- Country: United States
- Type: Training division
- Role: Training
- Size: Division
- Part of: United States Army Reserve; 108th Training Command
- Garrison/HQ: Joint Base Lewis–McChord, Washington, U.S.
- Nicknames: "Timberwolf Division" "Nightfighters"
- Mottos: "Nothing in Hell can stop the Timberwolves" "We Succeed"
- Engagements: World War II; Northern France; Rhineland; Central Europe

Commanders
- Commanding General: Brigadier General Vance Kuhner
- Command Sergeant Major: Command Sergeant Major Terrence Aleshire
- Notable commanders: Gilbert R. Cook (1942–1943); Terry de la Mesa Allen Sr. (1944–1945)

Insignia
- Distinctive Unit Insignia

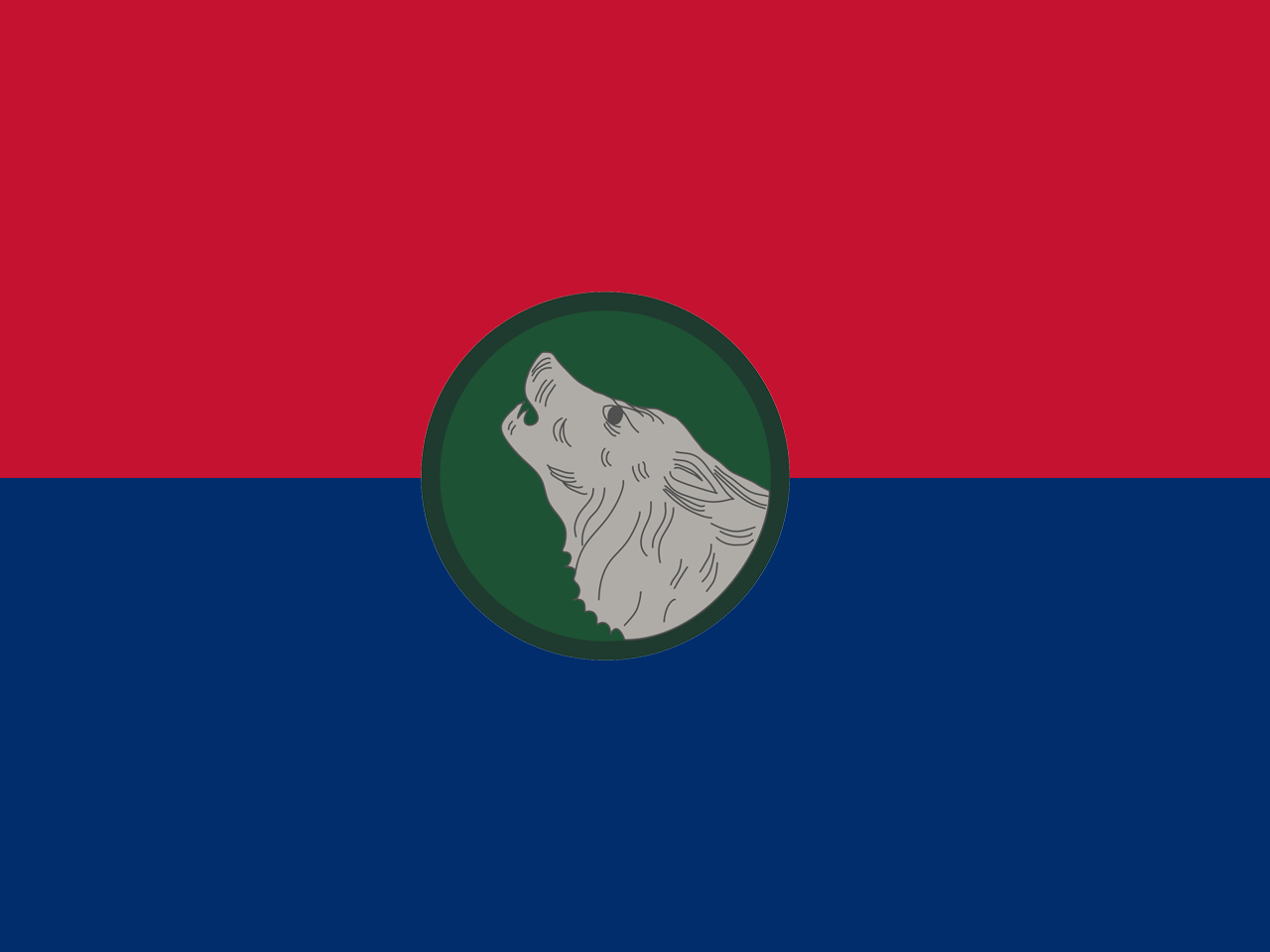
- Flag of the United States Army 104th Infantry Division

The 104th Infantry Division was an infantry division of the United States Army. Today it exists as the 104th Training Division (Leader Training), a component of the United States Army Reserve headquartered at Joint Base Lewis–McChord, Washington. It is one of three training divisions subordinate to the 108th Training Command. The division's 1st Brigade provides Cadet Summer Training (CST) to Reserve Officers' Training Corps units and support to Senior Reserve Officers' Training Corps personnel (SROTC). The division's 2nd Brigade provides Basic Combat Training (BCT) to drill sergeants and also provides support to the United States Military Academy. The division is slated to be deactivated by October 2026.

Activated in 1921 and deployed during World War II, the division saw almost 200 days of fighting in northwestern Europe as it fought through France, Netherlands, Belgium, and western Germany, fighting back several fierce German counterattacks as it advanced through the theater throughout late 1944 and 1945. This was the only combat duty that the 104th Infantry Division has served during its history. At the end of the fighting on 7 May 1945 (V-E Day), this division was in central Germany opposite the troops of its allies from the Soviet Army.

After World War II, this division was reorganized primarily as a training division for Reserve forces. After several decades, the division then expanded its role to conducting entry-level training for soldiers of all branches of the Army in the northwestern United States. Its role and size have expanded over that time due to the consolidation of other training commands, and the division subsequently took charge of a number of brigades specializing in various entry-level training for soldiers of all types.

== History ==
=== Interwar period ===
The 104th Division was constituted in the Organized Reserve on 24 June 1921, allotted to the Ninth Corps Area, and assigned to the XIX Corps. The division was allocated to the states of Utah, Idaho, Montana, and Wyoming as its home area, although the 2nd Battalion, 413th Infantry was organized at Reno, Nevada. The division headquarters was organized on 7 October 1921 at Fort Douglas, Utah, and relocated in May 1923 to Room 312 in the Commercial Building in Salt Lake City. The headquarters was moved on 30 September 1926 to the Vermont Building where it remained until activated for World War II. To maintain communications with the officers of the division, the division staff published a newsletter titled “Frontier Division,” which was reflective of the unit's geographical area. The newsletter informed the division's members what the division's summer training quotas were, where the camps were to be held, and which units would be assigned to help conduct the Citizens Military Training Camps (CMTC).

For the few summers when the division headquarters was called to duty for training as a unit, the 104th Division usually trained with the staff of the 3rd Division's 6th Infantry Brigade at Fort Douglas. The subordinate infantry regiments of the division held their summer training primarily with the units of the 3rd Division at Fort Douglas and Fort Missoula, Montana, and some years with the 2nd Division's 4th Infantry Brigade at the Pole Mountain Military Reservation, Wyoming. Other units, however, such as the special troops, artillery, engineers, aviation, medical, and quartermaster, trained at various posts in the Ninth Corps Area with Regular Army units of the same branch. For example, the 329th Engineer Regiment usually trained with elements of the 3rd Division's 6th Engineer Regiment at Camp Lewis, Washington, and the 329th Medical Regiment trained at the post hospital at Fort Francis E. Warren, Wyoming. In addition to the unit training camps, the infantry regiments of the division rotated responsibility to conduct the CMTC held at Camp Lewis each year.

On a number of occasions, the division participated in Ninth Corps Area and Fourth Army command post exercises in conjunction with other Regular Army, National Guard, and Organized Reserve units. These training events gave division staff officers’ opportunities to practice the roles they would be expected to perform in the event the division was mobilized. Unlike the Regular and Guard units in the Ninth Corps Area, however, the 104th Division did not participate in the various Ninth Corps Area maneuvers and the major Fourth Army maneuvers of 1936 and 1940 as an organized unit due to lack of enlisted personnel and equipment. Instead, the officers and a few enlisted reservists were assigned to the Regular and Guard units to fill vacant slots and bring the units up to full peace strength for the exercises. Additionally, some officers were assigned duties as umpires or as support personnel.

==== Order of battle, 1939 ====
- Headquarters (Salt Lake City, UT)
- Headquarters, Special Troops (Salt Lake City, UT)
  - Headquarters Company (Salt Lake City, UT)
  - 104th Military Police Company (Idaho Falls, ID)
  - 104th Signal Company (Salt Lake City, UT)
  - 329th Ordnance Company (Medium) (Great Falls, MT)
  - 104th Tank Company (Light) (Casper, WY)
- 207th Infantry Brigade (Boise, ID)
  - 413th Infantry Regiment (Salt Lake City, UT)
  - 414th Infantry Regiment (Pocatello, ID)
- 208th Infantry Brigade (Billings, MT)
  - 415th Infantry Regiment (Casper, WY)
  - 416th Infantry Regiment (Billings, MT)
- 179th Field Artillery Brigade (Casper, WY)
  - 385th Field Artillery Regiment (75 mm) (Salt Lake City, UT)
  - 386th Field Artillery Regiment (75 mm) (Helena, MT)
  - 387th Field Artillery Regiment (155 mm) (Salt Lake City, UT)
  - 329th Ammunition Train (Casper, WY)
- 329th Engineer Regiment (Salt Lake City, UT)
- 329th Medical Regiment (Salt Lake City, UT)
- 429th Quartermaster Regiment (Salt Lake City, UT)

=== World War II ===
Before Organized Reserve infantry divisions were ordered into active military service, they were reorganized on paper as "triangular" divisions under the 1940 tables of organization. The headquarters companies of the two infantry brigades were consolidated into the division's cavalry reconnaissance troop, and one infantry regiment was removed by inactivation. The field artillery brigade headquarters and headquarters battery became the headquarters and headquarters battery of the division artillery. Its three field artillery regiments were reorganized into four battalions; one battalion was taken from each of the two 75 mm gun regiments to form two 105 mm howitzer battalions, the brigade's ammunition train was reorganized as the third 105 mm howitzer battalion, and the 155 mm howitzer battalion was formed from the 155 mm howitzer regiment. The engineer, medical, and quartermaster regiments were reorganized into battalions. In autumn 1942, divisional quartermaster battalions were split into ordnance light maintenance companies and quartermaster companies, and the division's headquarters and military police company, which had previously been a combined unit, was split.

==== Division organization ====
The 104th Infantry Division was ordered into active military service on 15 September 1942 under the command of Major General Gilbert R. Cook, and was reorganized as the 104th Infantry Division at Camp Adair, Oregon. The division earned its nickname "Timberwolf Division" from its time in the northwest. The division consisted of the following units:

104th Infantry Division organization (click to enlarge)

- 104th Infantry Division
  - 104th Infantry Division Headquarters
  - 104th Cavalry Reconnaissance Troop (Mechanized) (M3 scout cars and then M8 Greyhound armored cars)
  - 413th Infantry Regiment
    - Headquarters and Headquarters Company
    - 3× Infantry battalions
      - each battalion consists of: 1× Headquarters and Headquarters Company, 3× Rifle companies, 1× Heavy Weapons Company
    - Cannon Company (T12 Gun Motor Carriages and T19 Howitzer Motor Carriages, later replaced by either M3 105mm towed howitzers or M7 Priest self propelled howitzers)
    - Anti-Tank Company (M3 37mm anti-tank guns, which were replaced by 1944 with M1 57mm anti-tank guns)
    - Service Company
  - 414th Infantry Regiment
    - same organization as 413th Infantry Regiment
  - 415th Infantry Regiment
    - same organization as 413th Infantry Regiment
  - 104th Infantry Division Artillery
    - Headquarters and Headquarters Battery
    - 385th Field Artillery Battalion
      - Headquarters and Headquarters Battery
      - 3× Batteries (M2 105mm towed howitzers)
      - Service Battery
    - 386th Field Artillery Battalion
      - same organization as 385th Field Artillery Battalion
    - 387th Field Artillery Battalion
      - Headquarters and Headquarters Battery
      - 3× Batteries (M1 155mm towed howitzers)
      - Service Battery
    - 929th Field Artillery Battalion
      - same organization as 385th Field Artillery Battalion
  - Headquarters Special Troops
    - Headquarters Company, 104th Infantry Division
    - 104th Signal Company
    - 104th Quartermaster Company
    - 804th Ordnance Light Maintenance Company
    - Military Police Platoon
    - 104th Infantry Division Band (attached)
  - 329th Engineer Combat Battalion
    - Headquarters and Headquarters and Service Company
    - 3× Engineer combat companies
  - 329th Medical Battalion
    - Headquarters and Headquarters Detachment
    - 3× Collecting companies
    - Clearing Company

Attached units:

- 750th Tank Battalion (attached 16 NOV 44-23 DEC 44, 6 FEB 45-22 MAY 45)
- 784th Tank Battalion (attached 31 DEC 44-3 FEB 45)
- 692nd Tank Destroyer Battalion (attached 29 OCT 44-7 MAR 45)
- 817th Tank Destroyer Battalion (attached 1 APR 45-9 JUN 45)
- 555th Anti-Aircraft Artillery Automatic Weapons Battalion (attached 26 OCT 44-24 MAY 45)

The 104th was the first U.S. Army division to be trained to fight in nighttime conditions. After training at Camp Adair, the division participated in the Oregon Maneuver combat exercise in the fall of 1943. On 15 October 1943, Major General Terry de la Mesa Allen Sr. took command of the division. He had previously commanded the 1st Infantry Division, "The Big Red One", in North Africa and Sicily and would command the 104th during most of its time in combat. On 7 December 1943, the division moved to, and began 13 weeks of desert training at Camp Hyder, Arizona. The division concluded training on 9 February 1944, and next moved to Camp Granite, California. One last move in March to Camp Carson, Colorado, aboard 24 trains was followed with a cross-county move to Camp Kilmer, New Jersey, arriving on 20 August 1944.

==== Combat chronicle ====
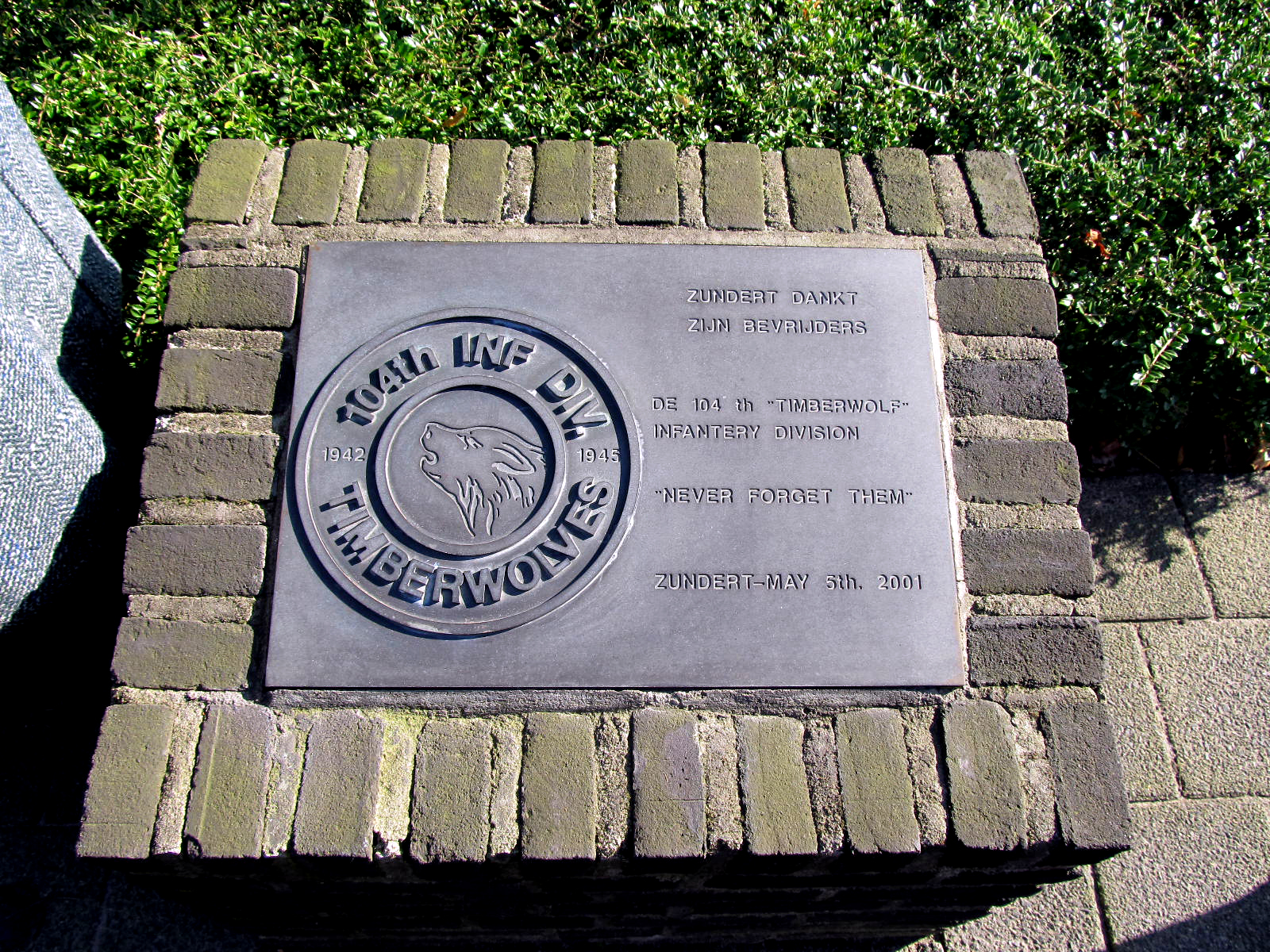
Timberwolf World War II Liberation Memorial in Zundert, Netherlands.

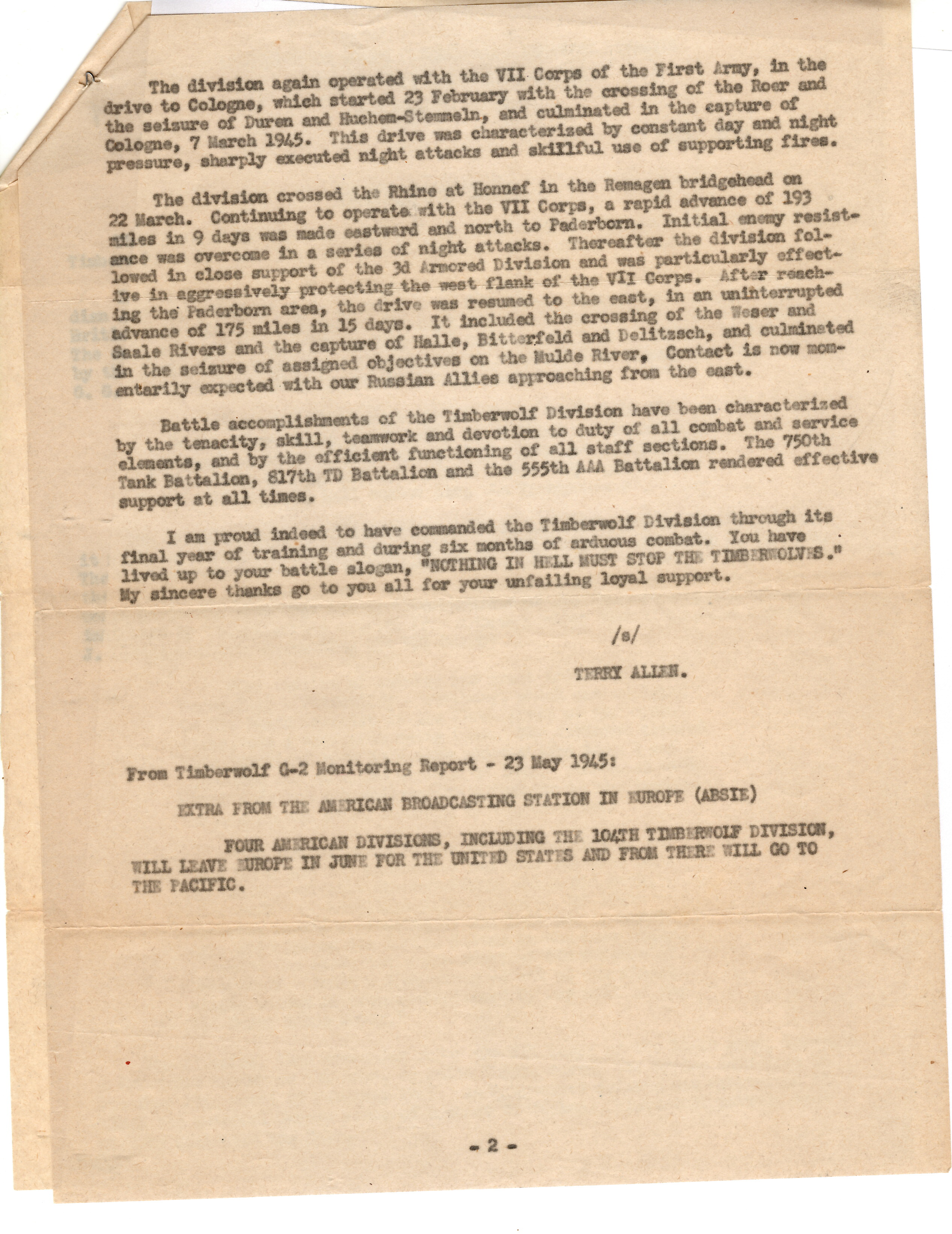
Message from Major General Terry Allen congratulating the Timberwolves. Page 2

The 104th Infantry Division sailed for the Western Front on 27 August 1944. It landed in France on 7 September 1944. The division was assigned to III Corps of the Ninth United States Army, part of the Twelfth United States Army Group. The division then organized and assembled at Manche, France before heading into combat.

Joining the Battle of the Scheldt, the division moved into defensive positions in the vicinity of Wuustwezel, Belgium on 23 October 1944. The Timberwolves were then assigned to Field Marshal Sir Bernard Montgomery's Anglo-Canadian 21st Army Group under the British I Corps, within the First Canadian Army, along with the U.S. 7th Armored Division, in order to clear out the Scheldt Estuary and open the port of Antwerp. While the U.S. 7th Armored Division was assigned static duty holding the right flank of the gains made during the failed Market Garden operation, the 104th Infantry Division was to participate in the First Canadian Army's taking of the Scheldt. The Timberwolves travelled across France by train and debarked near the Belgian-Dutch border and waited for word to take part in a new allied offensive, Operation Pheasant, taking the place of the experienced British 49th Infantry Division on the left flank and the Polish 1st Armored Division on the right.

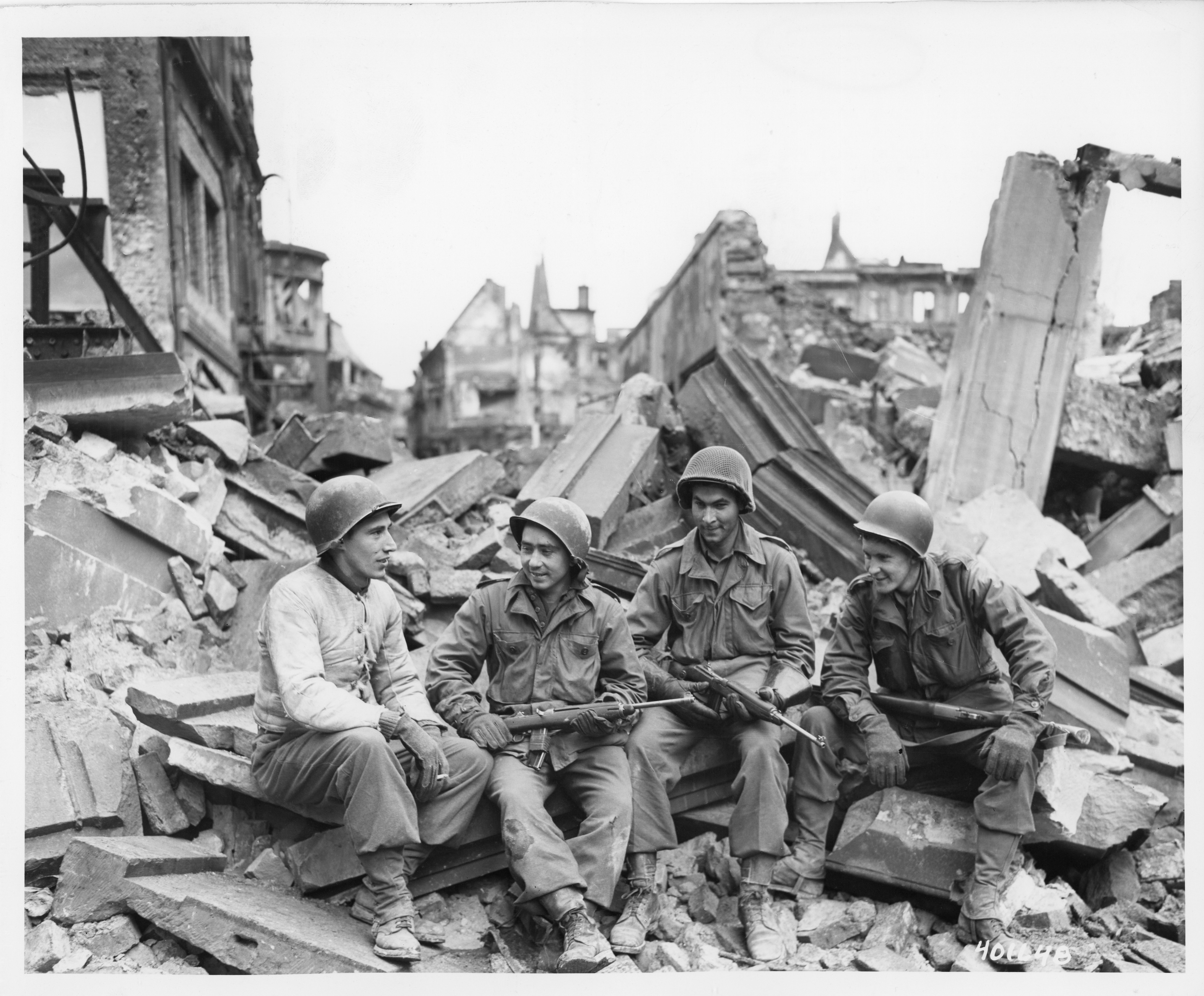
Combat infantrymen of Company G, 415th Infantry Regiment, 104th Infantry Division in Cologne, Germany.

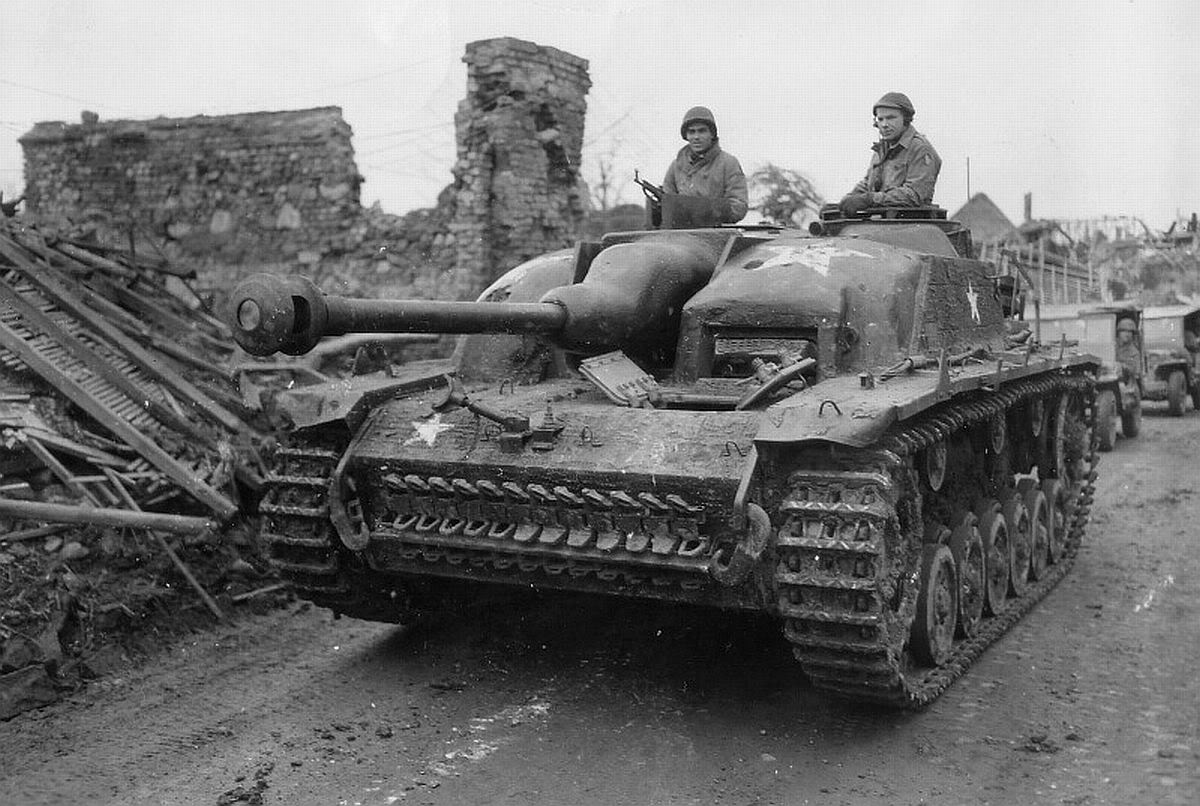
Soldiers of the 104th manning a Sturmgeschütz III with concrete armor, captured during the Battle of the Bulge. U.S. markings were added upon capture. The GI to the left is carrying a captured German StG 44.

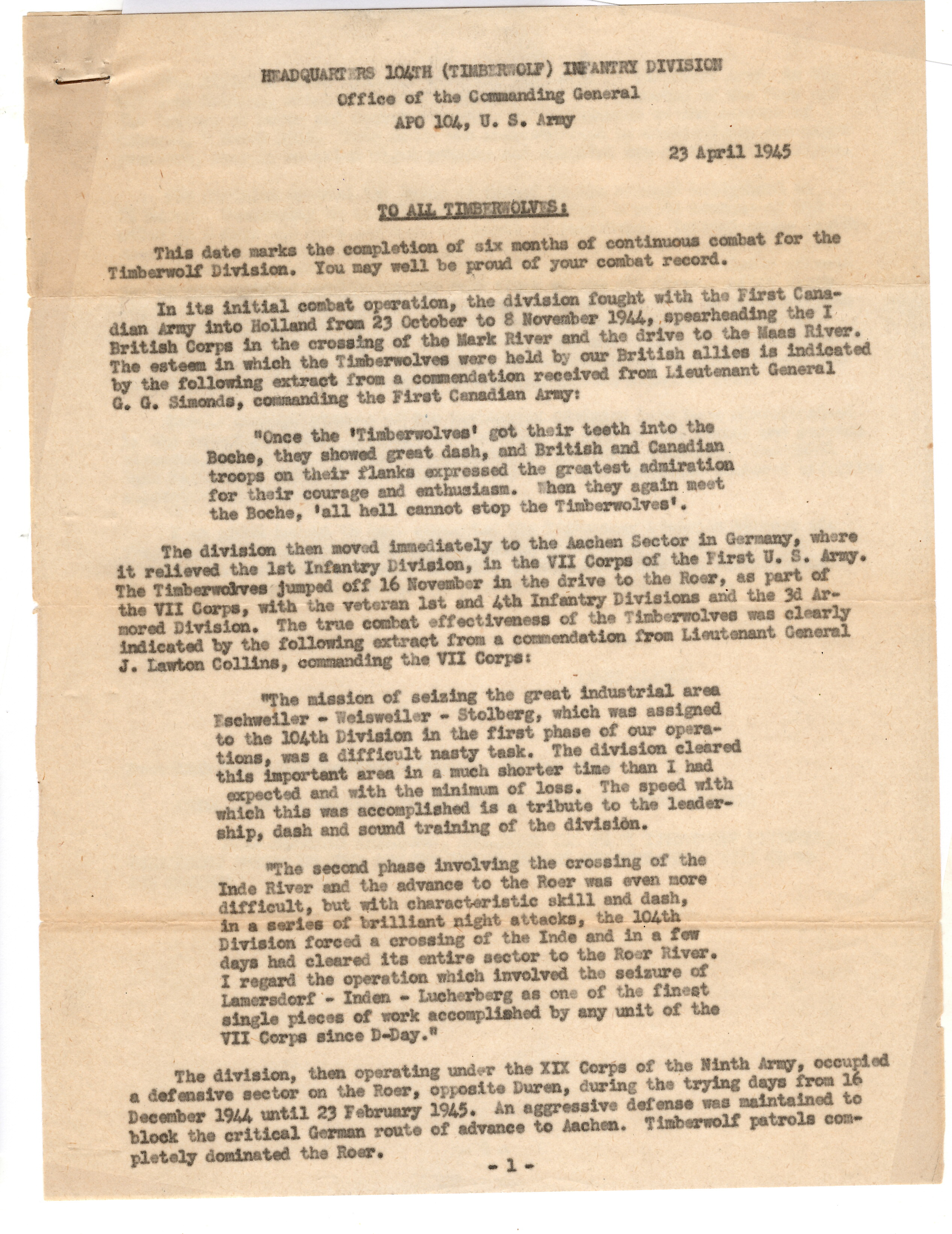
Message from Major General Terry Allen congratulating the Timberwolves. Page 1.

The Americans were given responsibility for taking 22 miles of wet, low country from the Belgian border to the Meuse (Maas). The width of their front was approximately 8,000 yards. General Allen planned to employ all three of his regiments at the same time, shoulder to shoulder. The 104th began combat operations on 25 and 26 October and began to attack the Germans, who offered varying levels of resistance. Along the division's front, the Germans were spread thinly and did not have continuous lines of defense. However, they did possess deadly strong points and endeavored to make the Timberwolves' progress as time-consuming and costly as possible, making heavy use of mines, booby traps, and roadblocks. Despite this, the advance was steady, though paid for in the lives of the 104th Division soldiers. Conditions were rainy, chilly, wet, and muddy. Moisture seemed to grip everything and everyone. Sleet beat down on the troops, who went for days soaked to the skin and slimy with mud. On 30 October, after five days of continuous operations the division had pushed about 15 miles to within sight of the Mark River and had liberated Zundert, gained control of the Breda-Roosendaal Road, and overrun the Vaart Canal defenses. Leur and Etten fell as the division advanced to the Mark River, arriving there by 31 October. A coordinated attack over the Mark River at Standdaarbuiten on 2 November established a bridgehead and the rest of the division crossed the river. With the Allies firmly on the north side of the Mark River, German resistance collapsed. For the next two days, the Timberwolves pursued enemy remnants north to the Meuse. Zevenbergen was captured and the Meuse was reached on 5 November. That same day, General Allen received orders from the U.S. First Army, releasing it from Canadian control. While the bulk of the division moved near Aachen, Germany, elements remained to secure Moerdijk until 7 November, when they were relieved. During this time, the division was reassigned to VII Corps of the U.S. 1st Army, also part of the Twelfth Army Group. By 7 November, the fighting in the Netherlands cost the Timberwolves 1,426 casualties, including 313 killed and 103 missing. Montgomery and the Canadian commanders sent their congratulations, and General Allen disseminated copies of their letters to his regiments and wrote a personal letter of thanks to everyone in the division, concluding with his favorite motto, "Nothing in Hell must stop the Timberwolves!" As a result of the actions of the 104th and their Allied counterparts, the Scheldt Estuary was cleared. The Royal Navy took three weeks to sweep the estuary waters clear of mines, and in early December 1944, the port of Antwerp was open to Allied shipping.

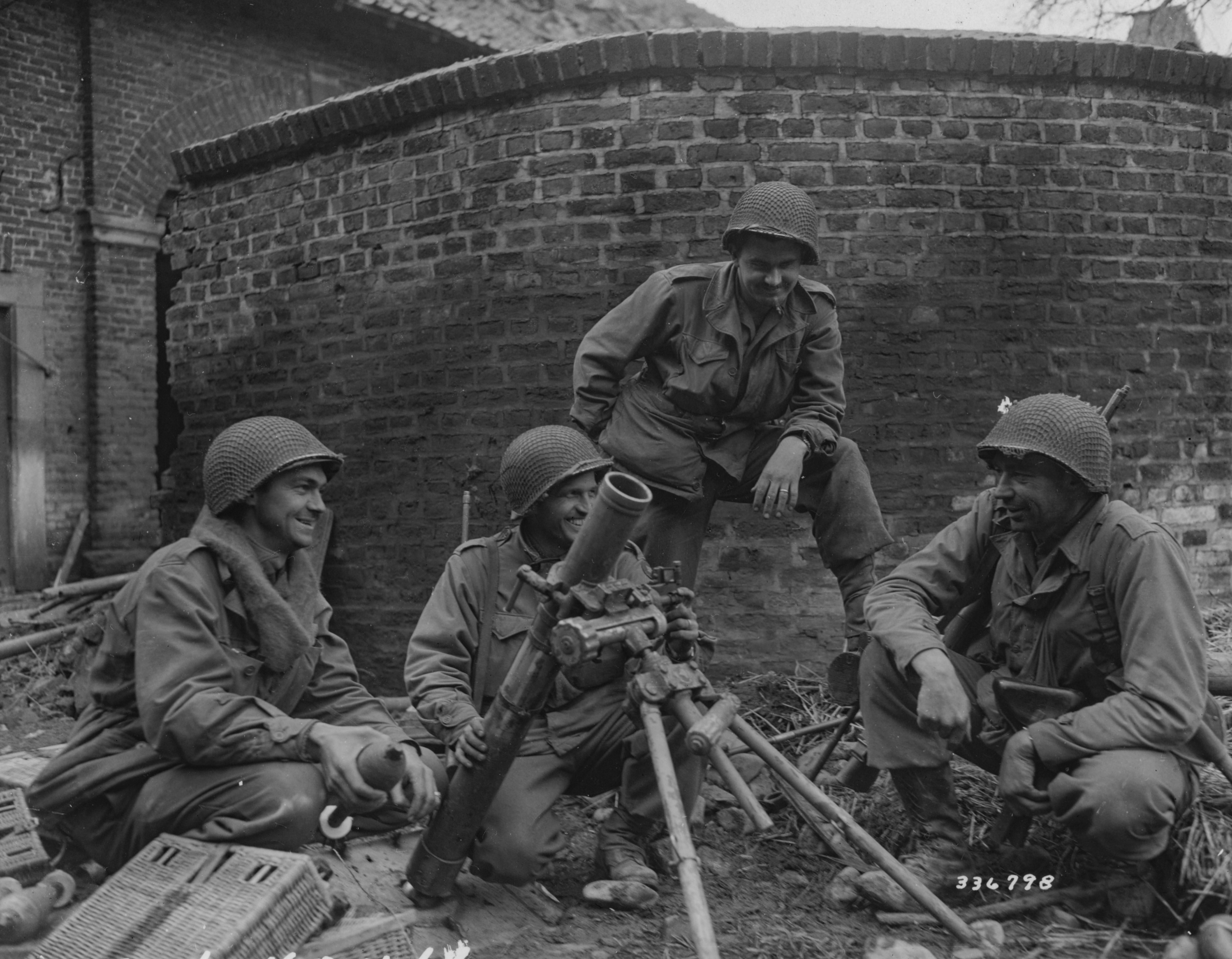
Four infantrymen of Company F, 413th Regiment, 104th Division, pose with a captured German 81mm mortar that they used to knock out a German 85mm gun near Duren, Germany, February 1945.

While under American command on 16 November 1944, the division went on another offensive in support of Operation Queen, taking Stolberg and pushing on against heavy resistance. Eschweiler fell on 21 November and the enemy was cleared from the area west of the Inde River, including Inden by 2 December 1944. Lucherberg was held against enemy counterattacks on 3 December, and all strongholds west of the Roer River were captured by the 23rd. It took temporary command of the 60th Infantry Regiment of the 9th Infantry Division. During the Battle of the Bulge, the 104th actively defended its sector near Duren and Merken (in German only) from 15 December 1944 to 22 February 1945. During that time, it was reassigned to XIX Corps of the Ninth United States Army. It then moved across the Roer taking Huchem-Stammeln, Birkesdorf, and North Duren.

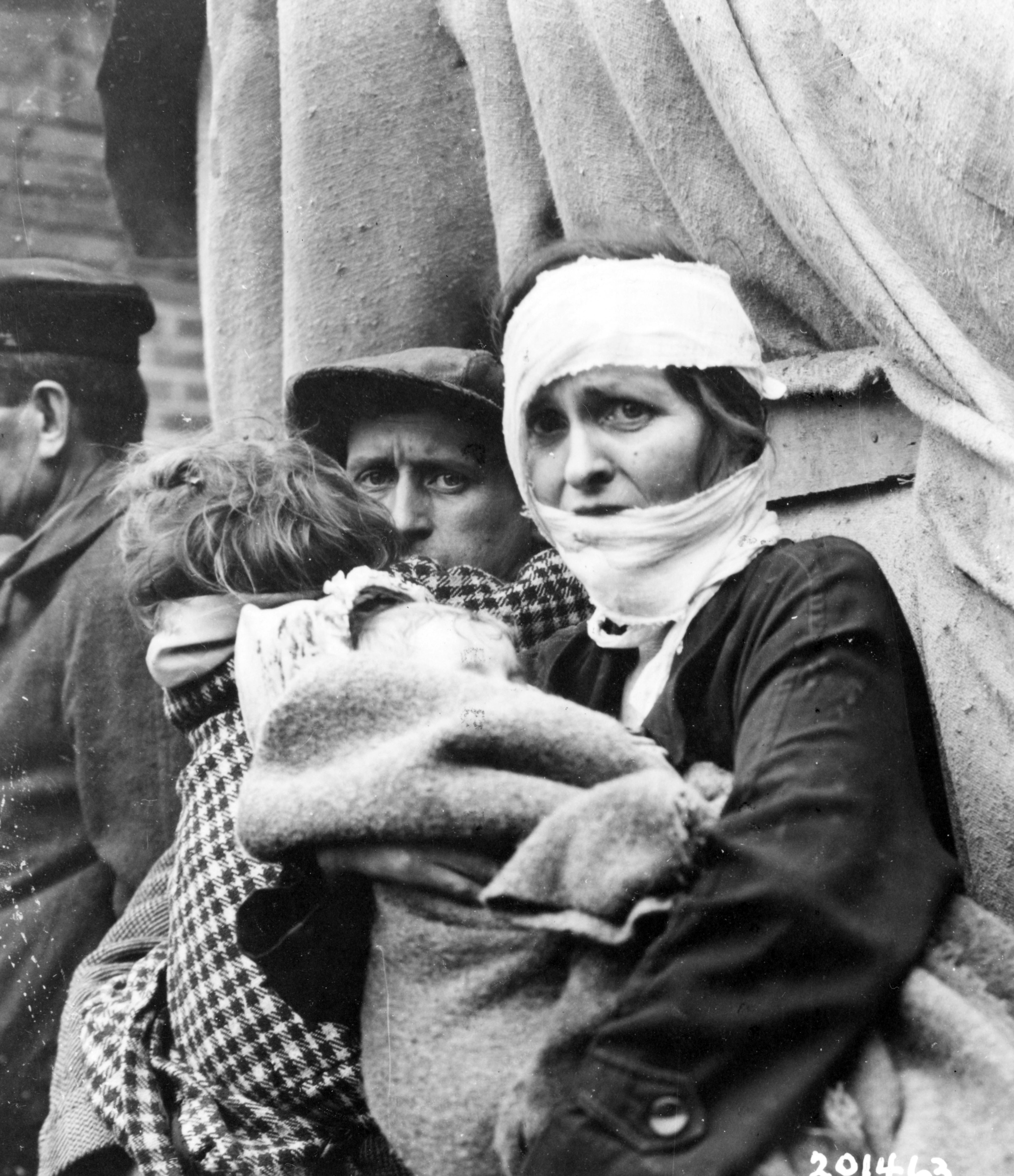
An injured German mother in Heppendorf in need of medical assistance, photographed by a member of the 413th Infantry Regiment (27 February 1945).

On 5 March, after heavy fighting, it entered Köln. After defending the west bank of the Rhine River, the division crossed the river at Honnef on 22 March 1945, and attacked to the east of the Remagen bridgehead. During this time, some of the division's assets fell under command of the 1st Infantry Division and the 3rd Armored Division.

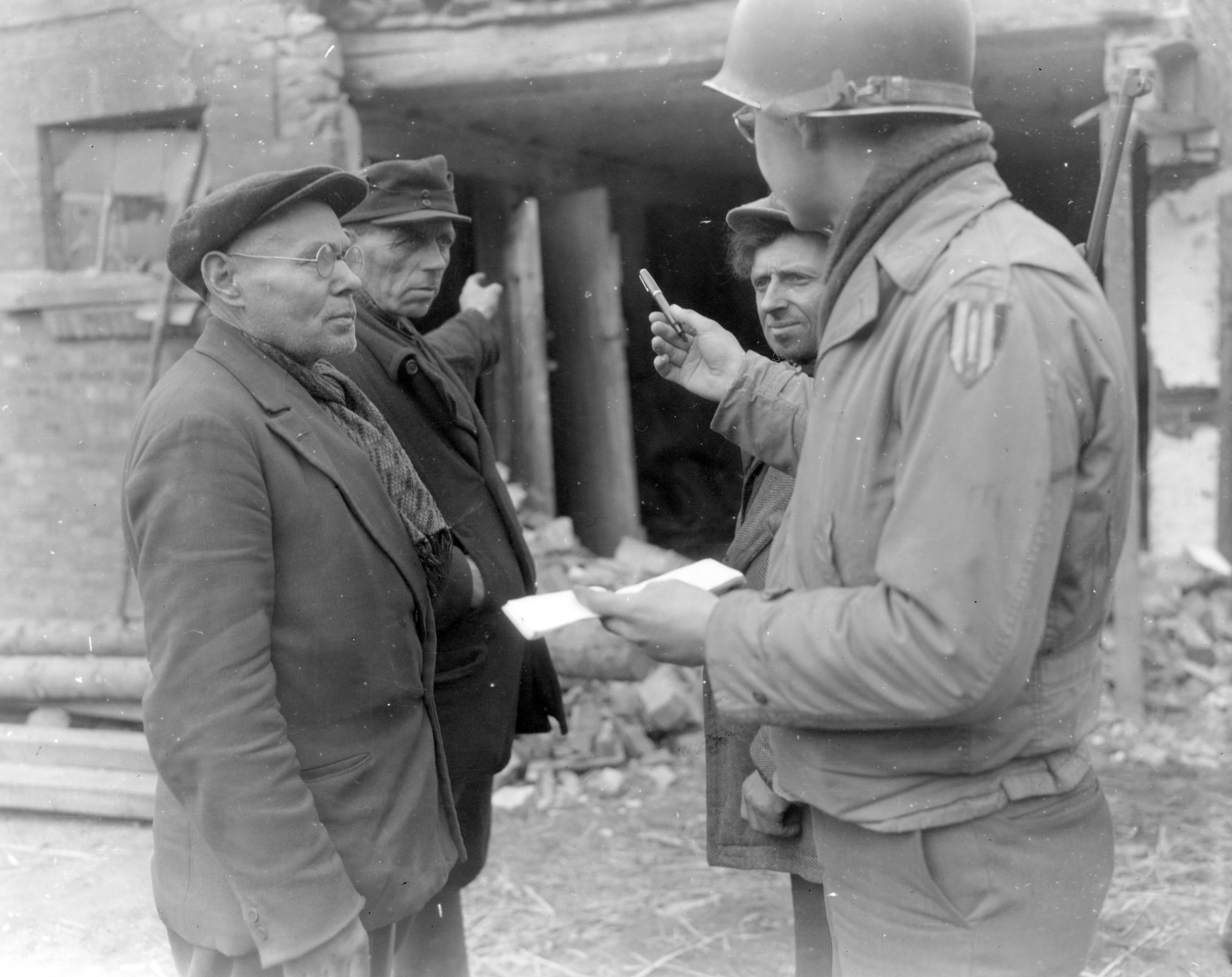
Three Volkssturm members point a 104th Division serviceman to their weapon cache.

After a period of mopping up and consolidation, it participated in the trap of enemy troops in the Ruhr pocket. The 104th repulsed heavy attacks near Medebach and captured Paderborn on 1 April 1945. After regrouping, it advanced to the east and crossed the Weser River on 8 April, blocking enemy exits from the Harz Mountains. On 11 April 1945 the Division was involved in the liberation of a large German concentration camp at Nordhausen. The division then crossed the Saale River and took Halle in a bitter five-day struggle from 15 to 19 April. The sector to the Mulde River was cleared by 21 April, and after vigorous patrolling, contacted the Red Army at Pretzsch on 26 April. The division took temporary command of assets from the 69th Infantry Division in early May.

==== Casualties ====
- Total battle casualties: 4,961
- Killed in action: 971
- Wounded in action: 3,657
- Missing in action: 96
- Prisoner of war: 237

==== Demobilization ====
The division returned to the United States on 3 July 1945, where it began making preparations for deployment to the Pacific Theater. After Japan surrendered, the division began the process of demobilization. The division was inactivated at Camp San Luis Obispo, California on 20 December 1945.

During World War II, soldiers of the division were awarded two Medals of Honor, 14 Distinguished Service Crosses, one Distinguished Service Medal, 642 Silver Star Medals, six Legion of Merit medals, 20 Soldier's Medals, 2,797 Bronze Star Medals, and 40 Air Medals. The division received 9 Distinguished Unit Citations and three campaign streamers during 200 days of combat.

=== Training Division ===
The division was reactivated on 1 December 1946 in the organized reserves in Portland, Oregon. It began taking on the responsibility of holding training programs for new soldiers of the US Army Reserve. In July 1948, the division held its first session of summer training. By the end of the training, it had turned out 300 new reservists. By 1952, the division was turning out 1,500 new reservists per training camp. The division was reorganized specifically as a training division in 1959. In 1961, the division was relocated to Vancouver Barracks, Washington.

In 1967, the division was reorganized. As part of an army-wide initiative known as the Reorganization Objective Army Division plan, the division's regiments were disbanded and replaced with larger and more versatile brigades. The 1st Brigade, 104th Division, activated at Vancouver Barracks, and the 2nd Brigade, 104th Division activated at Pasco, Washington. Meanwhile, the 3rd Brigade, 104th Division, as well as the 4th Brigade, 104th Division both activated at Fort Lawton, Washington. Each of these brigades carried the history of other historic units which fought under the 104th Infantry Division in World War II. The 104th Division was then assigned the mission of conducting One Station Unit Training, Basic Combat Training, Advanced Individual Training, and Combat Support training. 1st Brigade took on basic combat training, while 3rd Brigade undertook combat support training, 4th Brigade conducted combat service support training.

In 1996, three more brigades were added to the division's structure. The 5th Brigade, 104th Division was activated at Salt Lake City, Utah. The 6th Brigade, 104th Division was activated at Aurora, Colorado. The 7th Brigade, 104th Division activated at Vancouver, Washington. The 5th Brigade conducted health services training, 6th Brigade took charge of professional development training and 7th Brigade provided training support to the other brigades. These units were redesignated from other training commands and put under the command of the division.

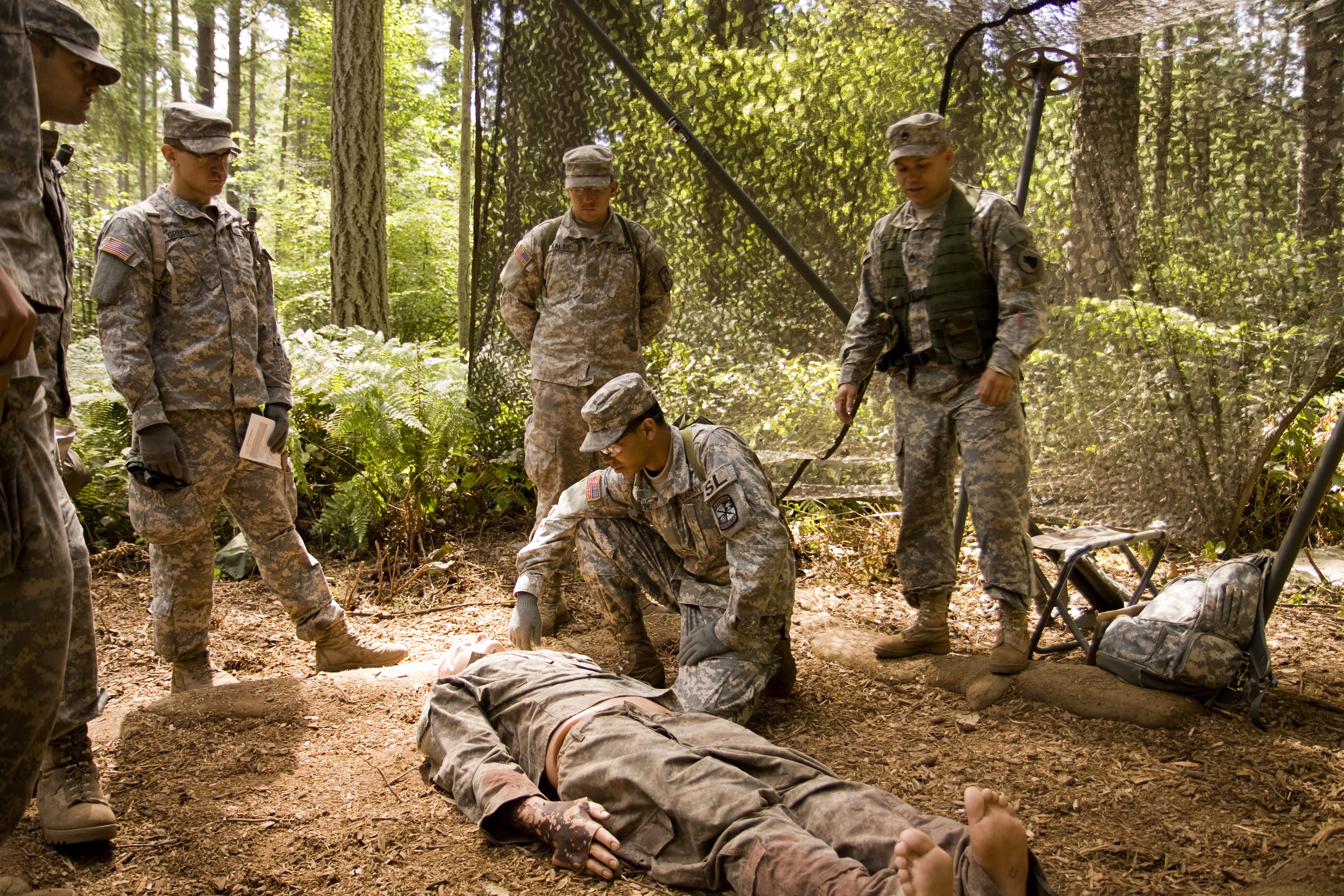
Members of the 104th providing instruction to ROTC cadets, in 2011

Two additional provisional brigades were created under the 104th Division in 1999; the 8th Brigade, 104th Division was created at Fort Lewis as a unit for training Reserve Officers' Training Corps cadets, and the 4960th US Army Reserve Forces School at Fort Shafter, Hawaii was redesignated as the 4960th Brigade, 104th Division, for service as a multifunctional training unit. In 2005, the Base Realignment and Closure suggestions included the closure of the Vancouver Barracks, and the 104th Division was subsequently relocated to Fort Lewis, Washington. In 2005, the current Distinctive Unit Insignia was designed under the direction of Major General Terrill K. (TK) Moffett. The 104th received its new distinctive unit insignia in 2006.

In October 2007, the division was renamed the 104th Training Division (Leader Training). This change reflected a change in the division's mission, specifically training officer and non-commissioned officer candidates in their assigned fields.

== Current organization ==
The 104th Training Division is a subordinate unit of the 108th Training Command, which is tasked with providing Initial Entry Training (IET) to new recruits. The division's 1st Brigade provides Cadet Summer Training (CST) to Reserve Officers' Training Corps units and support to Senior Reserve Officers' Training Corps personnel (SROTC). The division's 2nd Brigade provides Basic Combat Training (BCT) to drill sergeants and also provides support to the United States Military Academy. Besides providing training at their main training locations the division's battalions also operate numerous training detachments. As of January 2026 the following units are subordinated to the 95th Training Division:

- 104th Training Division (LT), at Joint Base Lewis–McChord (WA)
  - 1st Brigade (LT), in Aurora (CO)
    - 2nd Battalion, 319th Regiment (CST), in Salem (VA)
      - Detachment 1 (Alpha Company), 2nd Battalion, 319th Regiment (CST), in Fort Lee (VA)
    - 4th Battalion, 399th Regiment (CST), at Fort Knox (KY)
      - Detachment 2 (Bravo Company), 4th Battalion, 399th Regiment (CST), at Fort Campbell (TN)
    - 4th Battalion, 413th Regiment (SROTC EAST), at Fort Knox (KY)
    - 3rd Battalion, 414th Regiment (CST), at Joint Base Lewis–McChord (WA)
      - Detachment 10, 3rd Battalion, 414th Regiment (CST), in Vancouver (WA)
    - 4th Battalion, 414th Regiment (SROTC WEST), at Joint Base Lewis–McChord (WA)
  - 2nd Brigade (LT), in Lexington (KY)
    - 3rd Battalion, 304th Regiment (USMA), in Saco (ME)
      - Detachment 3 (Charlie Company), 3rd Battalion, 304th Regiment (BCT), in Schenectady (NY)
    - 2nd Battalion, 317th Regiment (BCT), in Lynchburg (VA)
      - Detachment 1 (Alpha Company), 2nd Battalion, 317th Regiment (BCT), in Charlottesville (VA)
      - Detachment 2 (Bravo Company), 2nd Battalion, 317th Regiment (BCT), in Salem (VA)
      - Detachment 3 (Charlie Company), 2nd Battalion, 317th Regiment (BCT), in Charleston (WV)
      - Detachment 5 (Echo Company), 2nd Battalion, 317th Regiment (BCT), in Culpeper (VA)
      - Detachment 6 (Foxtrot Company), 2nd Battalion, 317th Regiment (BCT), in Dublin (VA)
    - 2nd Battalion, 397th Regiment (BCT), in Lexington (KY)
      - Detachment 2 (Bravo Company), 2nd Battalion, 397th Regiment (BCT), in Fort Thomas (KY)
      - Detachment 3 (Charlie Company), 2nd Battalion, 397th Regiment (BCT), in Maineville (OH)
      - Detachment 6 (Foxtrot Company), 2nd Battalion, 397th Regiment (BCT), in Richmond (KY)
    - 1st Battalion, 398th Regiment (BCT), in Owensboro (KY)
      - Detachment 1 (Alpha Company), 1st Battalion, 398th Regiment (BCT), in Bowling Green (KY)
      - Detachment 2 (Bravo Company), 1st Battalion, 398th Regiment (BCT), in Nashville (TN)
      - Detachment 3 (Charlie Company), 1st Battalion, 398th Regiment (BCT), in Evansville (IN)
      - Detachment 5 (Echo Company), 1st Battalion, 398th Regiment (BCT), in Paducah (KY)

Abbreviations: IET — Initial Entry Training; BCT — Basic Combat Training; LT — Leader Training; CST — Cadet Summer Training; SROTC — Senior Reserve Officers' Training Corps; USMA — United States Military Academy

== Honors ==
=== Unit decorations ===
Ribbon	Award	Year	Subordinate Elements	Embroidered	Notes
	Army Superior Unit Award	1 Jan 2005 – 31 Dec 2006	104th Division (Institutional Training), HQ to include: Headquarters (less detachment), 1st Brigade, 104th Division, 1st Battalion, 414th Regiment, 2d Battalion, 414th Regiment, 1st Battalion, 415th Regiment, 2d Battalion, 415th Regiment, 3d Battalion, 415th Regiment, 1043d Training Detachment, Headquarters, 3d Brigade, 104th Division, 1st Battalion, 104th Regiment, 2d Battalion, 104th Regiment, 3d Battalion, 104th Regiment, 4th Battalion, 104th Regiment, 5th Battalion, 104th Regiment, 1041st Training Detachment, U.S. Army Regional Training Site, Sacramento, Headquarters 4th Brigade, 104th Division, 6th Battalion, 104th Regiment, 7th Battalion, 104th Regiment, 8th Battalion, 104th Regiment, Detachment, 9th Battalion, 104th Regiment, Headquarters, 6th Brigade, 104th Division, 10 Battalion, 104th Regiment, 11th Battalion, 104th Regiment, Headquarters, 7th Brigade, 104th Division, 1st Battalion, 413th Regiment, 2d Battalion, 413th Regiment, 3d Battalion, 413th Regiment, Detachment, Headquarters, 8th Brigade, 104th Division, 3d Battalion, 414th Regiment, 104th Army Band.	2005–2006	Permanent Orders 147-30

=== Campaign streamers ===
Conflict	Streamer	Year(s)
World War II	Northern France	1944
World War II	Rhineland	1944–1945
World War II	Central Europe	1945
World War II	World War II Victory	None

== Legacy ==
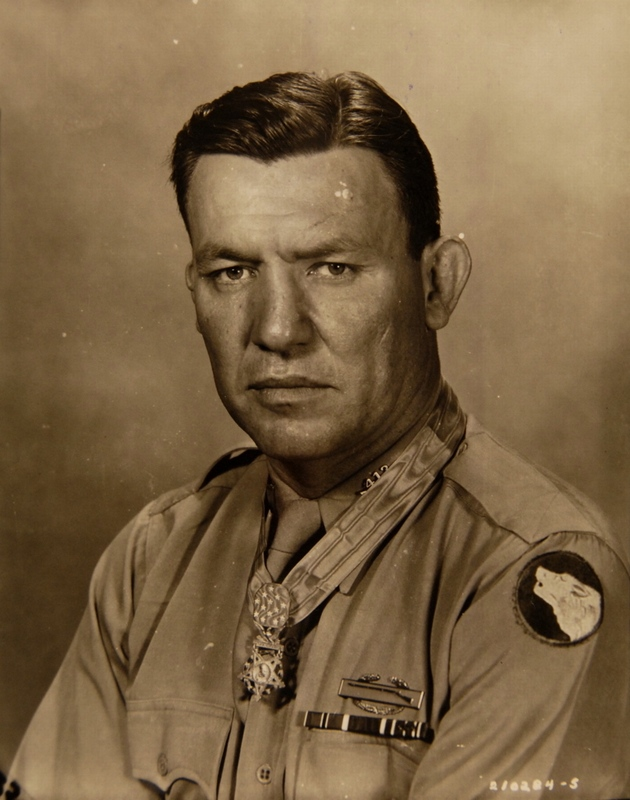
Medal of Honor recipient Cecil H. Bolton

Several men who served with the 104th Infantry Division later went on to achieve notability for various reasons. Among these are Rabbi Gunther Plaut, paleontologist Charles Repenning, Governor of Iowa Leo Hoegh, New York City Mayor Ed Koch, New York Governor Hugh L. Carey, judge Perry Shields, and U.S. Army generals John R. Deane Jr. and Bryant Moore. In addition, actor James G. Snitzer was a member of the 104th and died in combat in 1945. NFL player Bob Shaw also served with the 104th and was awarded the Bronze Star during World War II. Screenwriter Paddy Chayefsky also served with the 104th during WW II. Bernard Moore was a member of the 104th Timberwolves and went on to be the manager at the Waldorf Astoria Towers in New York, later promoted to the Washington Hilton in Washington, DC. Daniel K. Roberts, Purple Heart Medal recipient having stepped on a land mine on the French German border while going to get medic help for his sergeant for 30 plus years was the president of Robert Half Personnel Accountemps agencies with many US and Canadian locations.

In addition, two soldiers from this division were awarded the Medal of Honor for their service in combat. They are Willy F. James Jr., for scouting German positions while being pinned down by machine gun fire, and Cecil H. Bolton, who led a company of men on the attack despite wounds from a mortar shell.

== Notable former members ==
- Leo Hoegh, World War II
- Paddy Chayefsky, World War II
- Willy F. James Jr., World War II
- Edward Koch, World War II
- Victor A. Lundy, World War II
- James Marshall Sprouse, World War II
- Daniel K. Roberts, World War II

== Sources ==
- McGrath, John J. (2004). The Brigade: A History: Its Organization and Employment in the US Army. Combat Studies Institute Press. ISBN 978-1-4404-4915-4.
- Wilson, John B. (1999). "104th Division (Training)". Armies, Corps, Divisions, and Separate Brigades. United States Army Center of Military History. Archived from the original on 8 June 2010.
- Army Almanac: A Book of Facts Concerning the Army of the United States. United States Government Printing Office. 1959.
- Greenwald, Robert J., ed. (December 1945). "104th Infantry Division". Order of Battle of the United States Army World War II: European Theater of Operations – Divisions. Paris, France: Office of the Theater Historian. pp. 410–417. Archived from the original on 11 March 2008.
