= 1st Brigade, 104th Division =

- Shoulder sleeve insignia
- Active: 24 June 1921 – 20 December 1945; 1 December 1946 – Present
- Country: United States of America
- Branch: Army Reserve
- Type: Infantry
- Role: Training
- Size: Brigade
- Garrison/HQ: Fort Lewis, Washington
- Engagements: World War II • Battle of Hurtgen Forest • Battle of the Bulge

The 1st Brigade, 104th Division is a training brigade of the United States Army. It is a training component of the United States Army Reserve, and subordinate to the 104th Division based in Fort Lewis, Washington. It is primarily responsible for One Station Unit Training, Basic Combat Training and Military Police instruction.

The 1st Brigade traces its lineage back to the old headquarters element of the division. The 104th Infantry Division's original headquarters element was first constituted on 24 June 1921 as the 104th Division, before being organized and activated in October of that year in Salt Lake City, Utah. Assigned to the division were the 207th and 208th Infantry Brigades, containing the 413th, 414th, 415th, and 416th Infantry Regiments. As a unit of the Organized Reserves, the division represented assets from the states of Washington and Montana, among other areas of the northwest United States.

In 1967, the division's former headquarters element became 1st Brigade, 104th Division, activated at Vancouver Barracks. At this time, the army began consolidating its training units across the country, and as a result, the 104th Division took on missions of One Station Unit Training, Basic Combat Training, Advanced Individual Training, and Combat Support training. 1st Brigade took on basic combat training, a role it continues to this day

In the 1970s and 1980s, the brigade also took on One Station Unit Training and training for Military Police units. In 2005, the Base Realignment and Closure process included the closure of the Vancouver Barracks, and the 1st Brigade, 104th Division was subsequently relocated to Fort Lewis, Washington, though its duties remained the same.

== Campaign streamers ==
Conflict	Streamer	Year(s)
World War II	Rhineland	1944–1945
World War II	Ardennes-Alsace	1944–1945
World War II	Central Europe	1945

== Sources ==
- McGrath, John J. (2004). The Brigade: A History: Its Organization and Employment in the US Army. Combat Studies Institute Press. ISBN 978-1-4404-4915-4.
- Wilson, John B. (1999). Armies, Corps, Divisions, and Separate Brigades. Department of the Army. ASIN B000OJKX1S.
- Army Almanac: A Book of Facts Concerning the Army of the United States. United States Government Printing Office. 1959. ASIN B0006D8NKK.
- Order of Battle of the United States Army: World War II European Theater of Operations. Department of the Army. 1998 [1st Pub. 1945]. ISBN 978-0-16-001967-8.
