= Cecil H. Bolton =

United States Army Medal of Honor recipient (1908–1965)

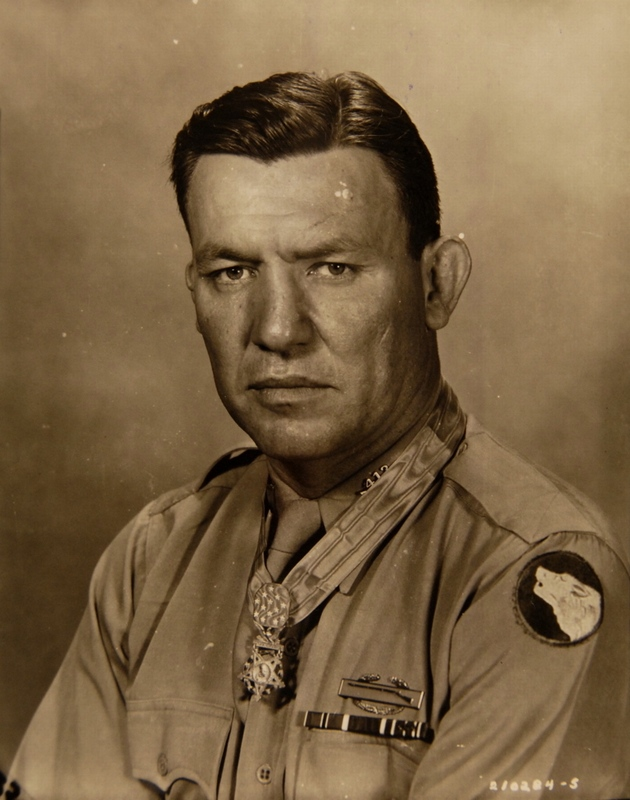
- Born: October 7, 1908; Crawfordville, Florida, US
- Died: January 22, 1965 (aged 56); San Antonio, Texas, US
- Burial place: Fort Sam Houston National Cemetery, San Antonio, Texas
- Military career
- Allegiance: United States of America
- Branch: United States Army
- Service years: 1942 - 1962
- Rank: Colonel
- Units: 413th Infantry Regiment, 104th Infantry Division
- Conflicts: World War II; Korean War
- Awards: Medal of Honor; Silver Star; Bronze Star Medal (2); Purple Heart

Cecil Hamilton Bolton (October 7, 1908 – January 22, 1965) was a United States Army officer and a recipient of the United States military's highest decoration—the Medal of Honor—for his actions in World War II.

== Biography ==
Bolton joined the Army from Ft McClellan, near Anniston, Alabama on the 27th of July, 1942, and by November 2, 1944 was serving as a first lieutenant in Company E, 413th Infantry Regiment, 104th Infantry Division. On that day, near the Mark river in North Brabant, the Netherlands, he was seriously wounded in the legs by a German artillery shell. Despite these wounds, he took two men and led them in a successful assault against three German positions which were firing on his company. Wounded a second time, he ordered his two companions to leave him behind and head for the safety of the American lines. He then crawled the rest of the way back to his company. For these actions, he was awarded the Medal of Honor ten months later, on September 1, 1945.

Bolton reached the rank of colonel before leaving the Army in 1962. He died at age 56 and was buried in Fort Sam Houston National Cemetery, San Antonio, Texas.

== Medal of Honor citation ==
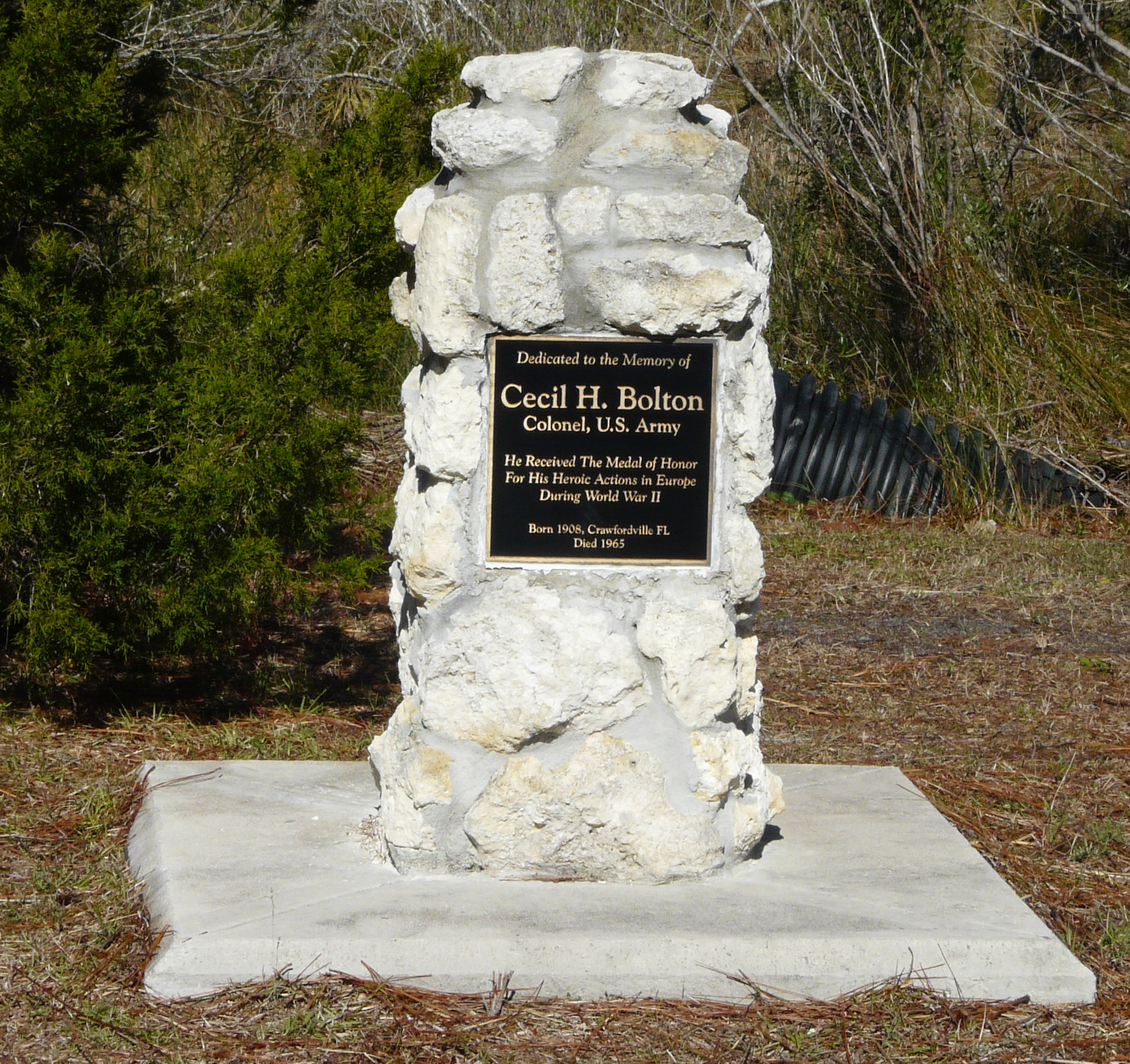
Monument to Cecil H. Bolton in Panacea, Florida

Bolton's official Medal of Honor citation reads:

As leader of the weapons platoon of Company E, 413th Infantry, on the night of November 2, 1944, he fought gallantly in a pitched battle which followed the crossing of the Mark River in the Netherlands. When 2 machineguns pinned down his company, he tried to eliminate, with mortar fire, their grazing fire which was inflicting serious casualties and preventing the company's advance from an area rocked by artillery shelling. In the moonlight it was impossible for him to locate accurately the enemy's camouflaged positions; but he continued to direct fire until wounded severely in the legs and rendered unconscious by a German shell. When he recovered consciousness he instructed his unit and then crawled to the forward rifle platoon positions. Taking a two-man bazooka team on his voluntary mission, he advanced chest deep in chilling water along a canal toward 1 enemy machinegun. While the bazooka team covered him, he approached alone to within 15 yards of the hostile emplacement in a house. He charged the remaining distance and killed the 2 gunners with hand grenades. Returning to his men he led them through intense fire over open ground to assault the second German machinegun. An enemy sniper who tried to block the way was dispatched, and the trio pressed on. When discovered by the machinegun crew and subjected to direct fire, 1st Lt. Bolton killed 1 of the 3 gunners with carbine fire, and his 2 comrades shot the others. Continuing to disregard his wounds, he led the bazooka team toward an 88-mm. artillery piece which was having telling effect on the American ranks, and approached once more through icy canal water until he could dimly make out the gun's silhouette. Under his fire direction, the two soldiers knocked out the enemy weapon with rockets. On the way back to his own lines he was again wounded. To prevent his men being longer subjected to deadly fire, he refused aid and ordered them back to safety, painfully crawling after them until he reached his lines, where he collapsed. 1st Lt. Bolton's heroic assaults in the face of vicious fire, his inspiring leadership, and continued aggressiveness even through suffering from serious wounds, contributed in large measure to overcoming strong enemy resistance and made it possible for his battalion to reach its objective.

== See also ==
- List of Medal of Honor recipients
- List of Medal of Honor recipients for World War II
