= Peter de Clercq =

Peter de Clercq (born 1959, Etten-Leur) is a Dutch diplomat who currently is the Deputy Special Representative of the Secretary-General for the United Nations Assistance Mission in Somalia (UNSOM), where he also serves as United Nations Resident Coordinator, Humanitarian Coordinator and United Nations Development Programme (UNDP) Resident Representative. He was appointed to this position by United Nations Secretary-General Ban Ki-moon on 18 June 2015.

== Biography ==
De Clercq graduated with a M.A. in development sociology from University of Tilburg in the Netherlands. He also attended the Netherlands Institute of International Relations Clingendael in The Hague.

A veteran of the United Nations system, his career includes 27 years of service at the United Nations High Commissioner for Refugees (UNHCR), holding various capacities in a number of locations, including Sudan, Zimbabwe, Angola and Pakistan.

Prior to his appointment in Somalia, he served as Deputy Special Representative of the Secretary-General for the United Nations Stabilisation Mission in Haiti (MINUSTAH). He also served as Senior Adviser to the Special Representative of the Secretary-General for Somalia (United Nations Assistance Mission in Somalia, UNSOM) and prior to that Deputy Special Representative for Somalia (United Nations Political Office for Somalia, UNPOS).
