= Merkén =

Smoked chili pepper condiment traditional in Chilean cuisine

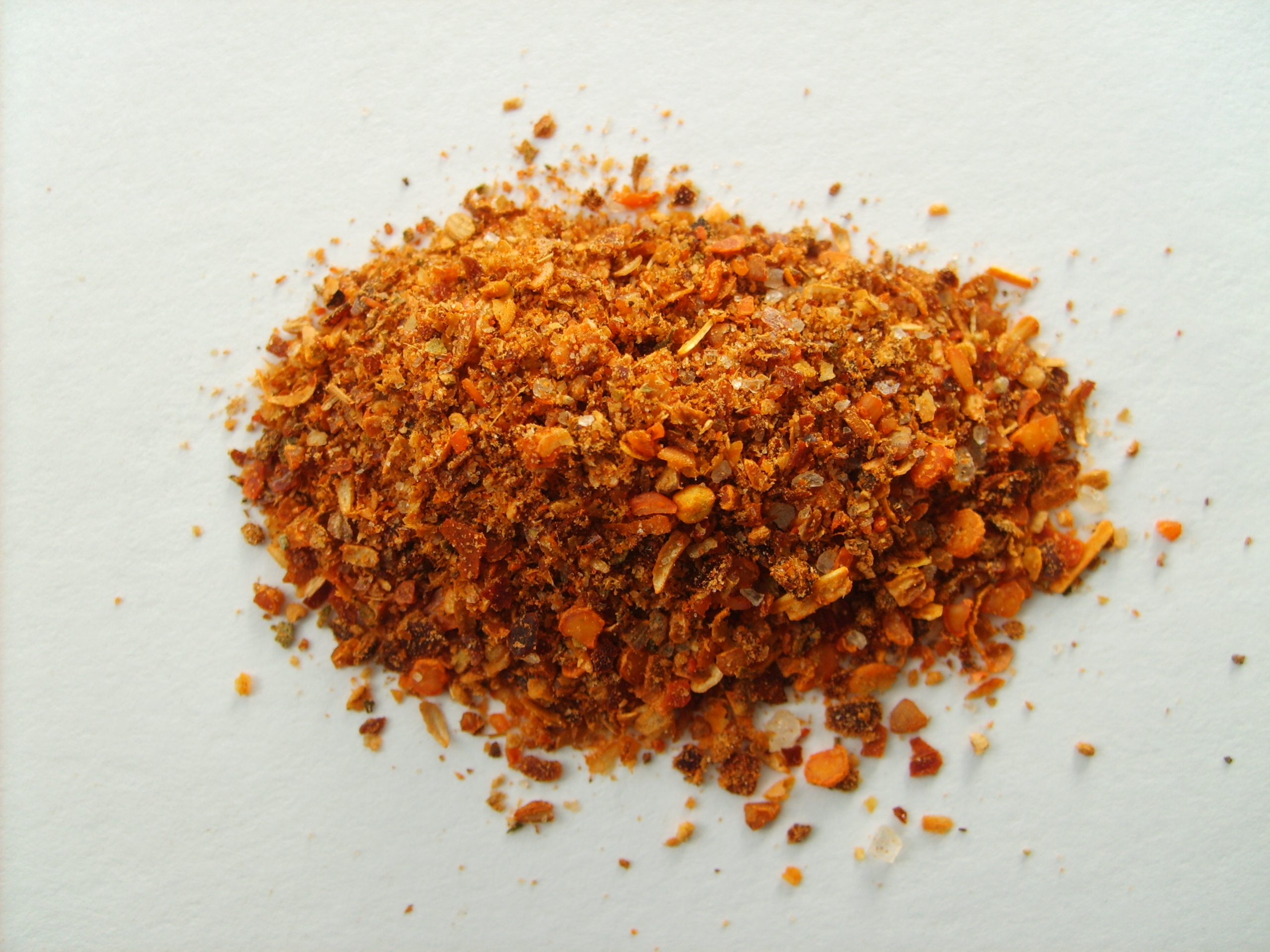
Merkén

Merkén or merquén (Mapudungun: mezkeñ [meʐˈkeɲ] or merkeñ [meɻˈkeɲ]) is a smoked chili pepper used as a condiment that is often combined with other ingredients when in ground form. It is a traditional condiment in Mapuche cuisine in Chile.

== Ingredients ==
The base ingredient of merkén is the smoked pepper "cacho de cabra" (Capsicum annuum var. longum), a dried, smoked, red pepper that is sometimes ground with toasted coriander seed and salt. The peppers are dried naturally in the sun and are then smoked over a wood fire. They are then stored by being hung to dry prior to grinding. Once reduced to powder or flakes, the peppers are often mixed with salt and roasted ground coriander seed. Commercially, merkén pepper with only an addition of salt is known as "natural merken" (merkén natural), while "special merkén" (merkén especial) contains coriander seeds. The composition of special merkén is about 70% chili, 20% salt, and 10% coriander seed.

== Culinary use ==
Merkén originates primarily from the cuisine of the Mapuche of the Araucanía Region of Chile, but is also used in Chilean cuisine as a replacement for fresh chili. Since the beginning of the 21st century, merkén has drawn the attention of professional chefs and has begun to find an international market, at the same time, having a widespread use in Chilean cuisine.

Merkén is most commonly used as:

- A general condiment for seasoning dishes such as lentils, gold potatoes, and sautéed vegetables
- A dry rub for tuna, lamb, pork, duck or beef
- A sprinkle, spice rub, or boiling spice for seafood including crab
- An addition to stews, savory pies, and purees
- A spice for ceviches
- An addition to cow or goat cheese
- An addition to peanuts or salty olives

== See also ==
- List of smoked foods
