= Etten-Leur =

- Municipality
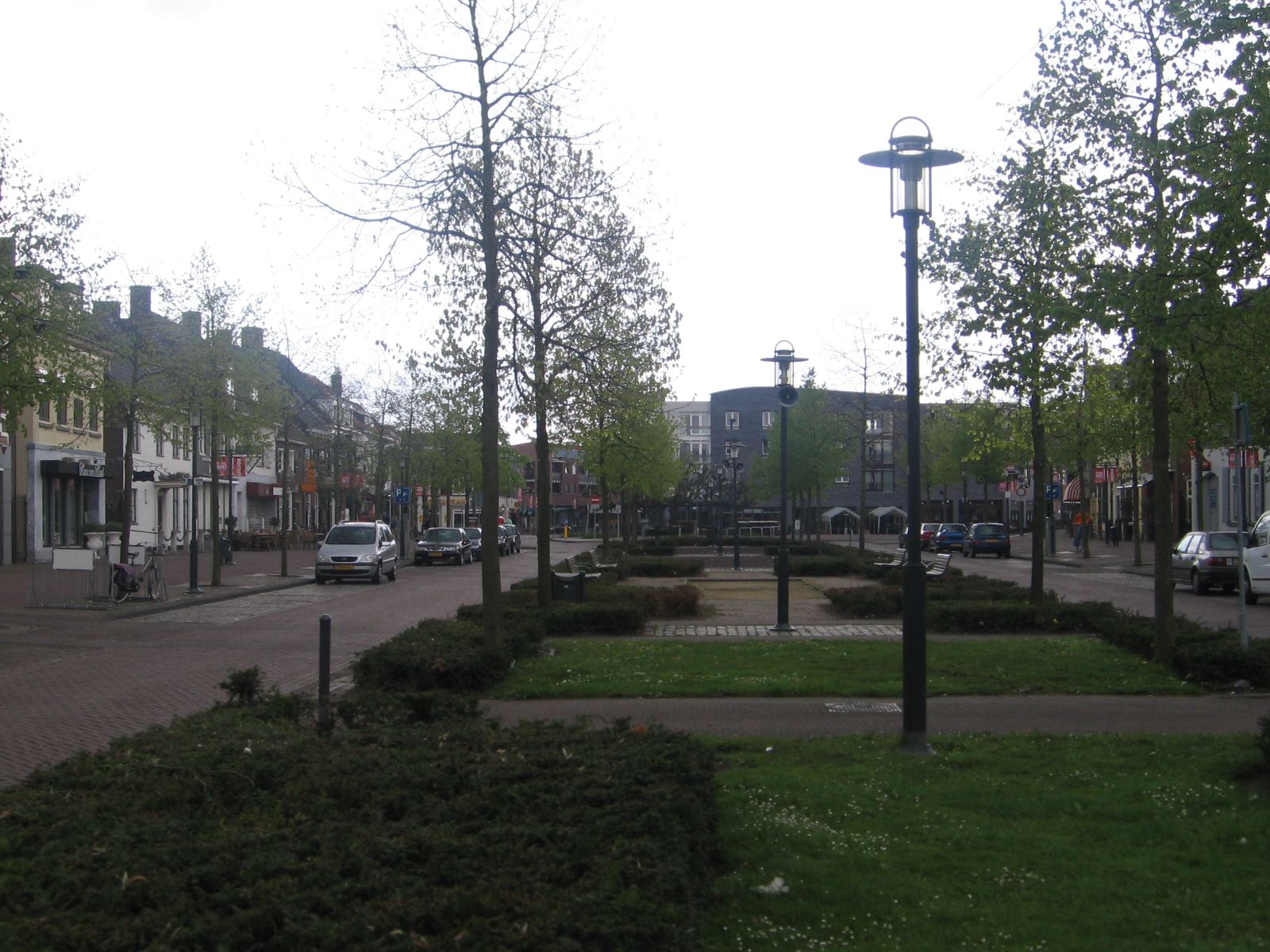
- Street (Markt) in Etten-Leur

- Flag Coat of arms

- Location in North Brabant
- Coordinates: 51°34′N 4°38′E
- Country: Netherlands
- Province: North Brabant

Government
  - Body: Municipal council
  - Mayor: Miranda de Vries (PvdA)

Area
  - Total: 55.92 km^{2} (21.59 sq mi)
  - Land: 55.30 km^{2} (21.35 sq mi)
  - Water: 0.62 km^{2} (0.24 sq mi)
- Elevation: 8 m (26 ft)

Population (January 2021)
  - Total: 43,869
  - Density: 793/km^{2} (2,050/sq mi)
- Time zone: UTC+1 (CET)
  - Summer (DST): UTC+2 (CEST)
- Postcode: 4870–4879
- Area code: 076
- Website: www.etten-leur.nl

Etten-Leur (Dutch pronunciation: [ˌɛtə(n) ˈløːr]) is a municipality in the Dutch province North Brabant. Its name is a combination of the two villages from which the municipality originally arose: Etten and Leur.

== History ==
The villages were always part of one municipality, originally called "Etten c.a." (cum annexis), this later to change to "Etten en Leur". The current name was adopted in 1968. By that time, the villages had grown into one.

Both villages, created in the Middle Ages, were relatively prosperous during the period of the Dutch Republic, the exception being the period of the Eighty Years' War in which the area was a major battleground. This prosperity was caused by the fact that Etten was a centre for the production of peat, and Leur was a local trading port, as it had a harbour.

Decline in economic importance marked both villages during the nineteenth century. In 1836 Arnold Damen left Leur in order to work as a missionary in the United States. The painter Vincent van Gogh briefly lived in Etten, making him the most famous citizen in the history of Etten and Leur. During World War II, the two villages were freed from German occupation in late October 1944 by elements of the U.S. 104th Infantry Division.

The economic decline was halted when, in 1950, the Dutch government decided to encourage population growth and industrial development. As a result of this development, both towns have grown towards each other and merged into one: Etten-Leur.

== Topography ==
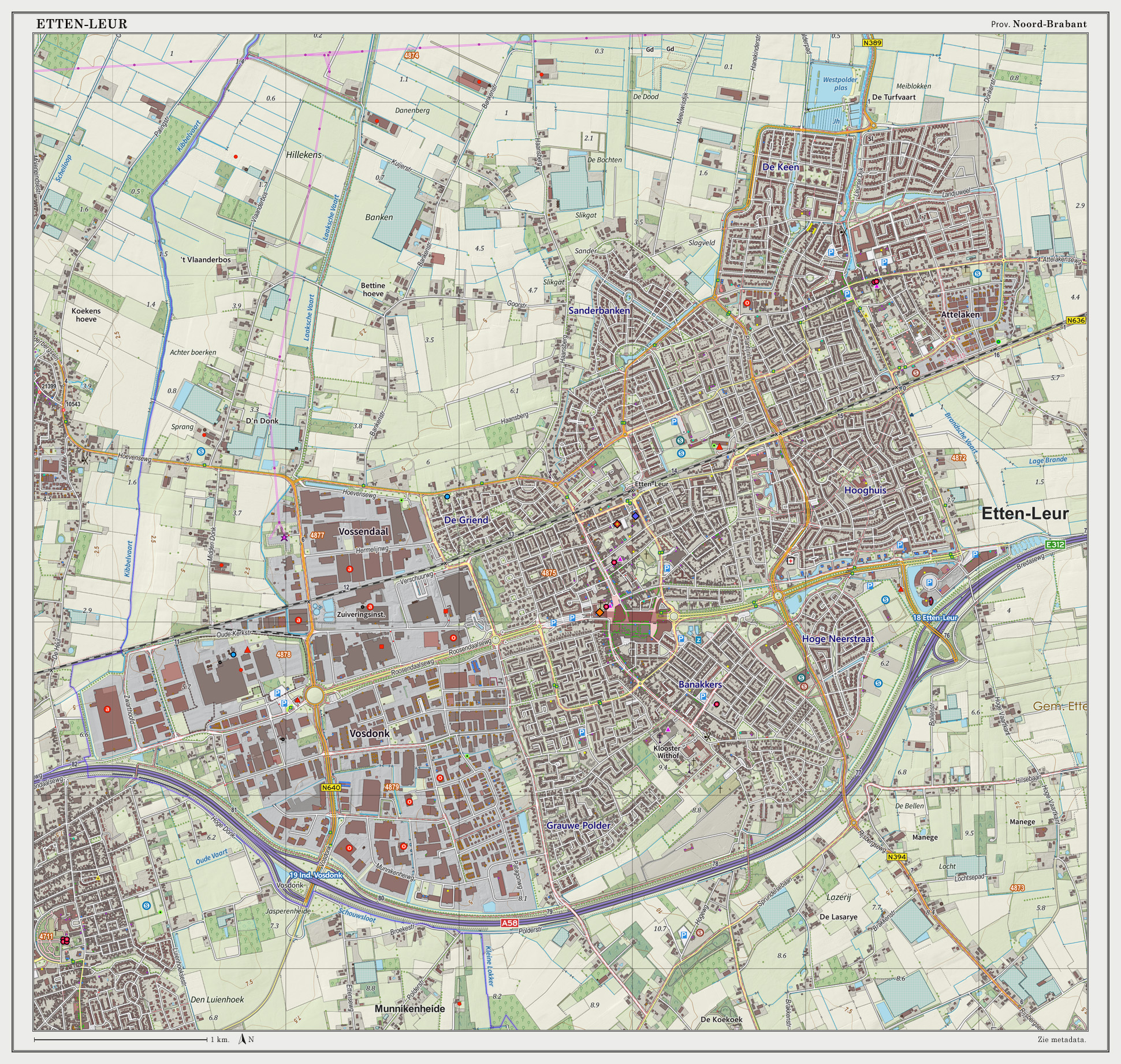
Dutch topographic map of Etten-Leur (town), March 2014

== Education ==
- Katholieke Scholengemeenschap Etten-Leur, a Catholic high school
- Munnikenheide College

== Transportation ==
- Etten-Leur railway station

== Notable people ==
- Jan Jacob Rochussen (1797 in Etten – 1871) a Dutch politician; Finance Minister 1840/1843 and Governor-General of the Dutch East Indies 1845/1851
- Peter de Clercq (born 1959 in Etten-Leur) a Dutch diplomat, who currently works with the United Nations
- Stef Broks (born 1981 in Etten-Leur) a Dutch drummer, played with Textures
- Danny van Trijp (born 1996 in Etten-Leur) a Dutch Darts player, who currently plays in PDC events
- Vincent van Gogh opened his first art studio in Etten in 1881. His career as an artist began in Etten.

== Gallery ==
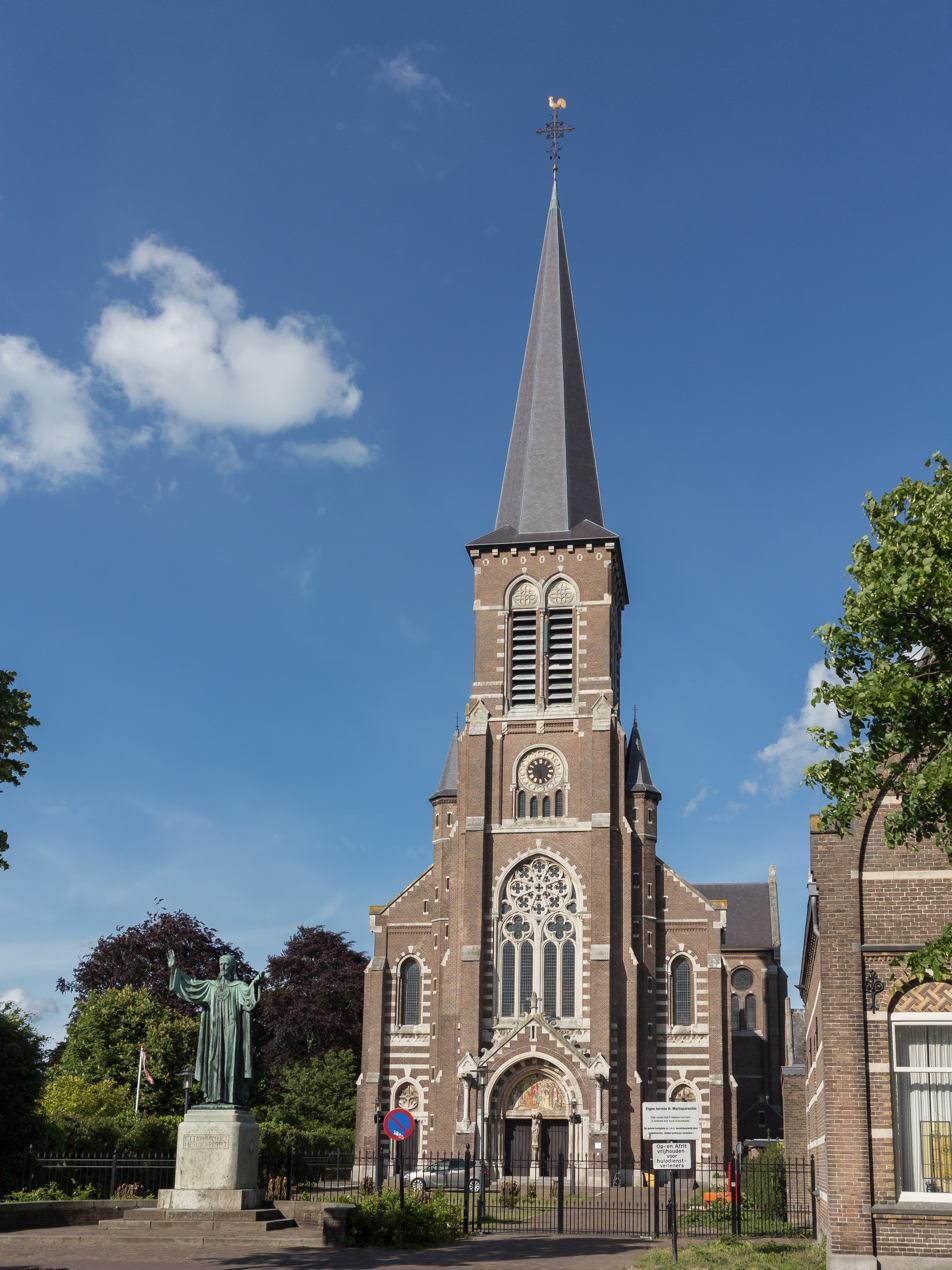
Church: de Sint Lambertuskerk

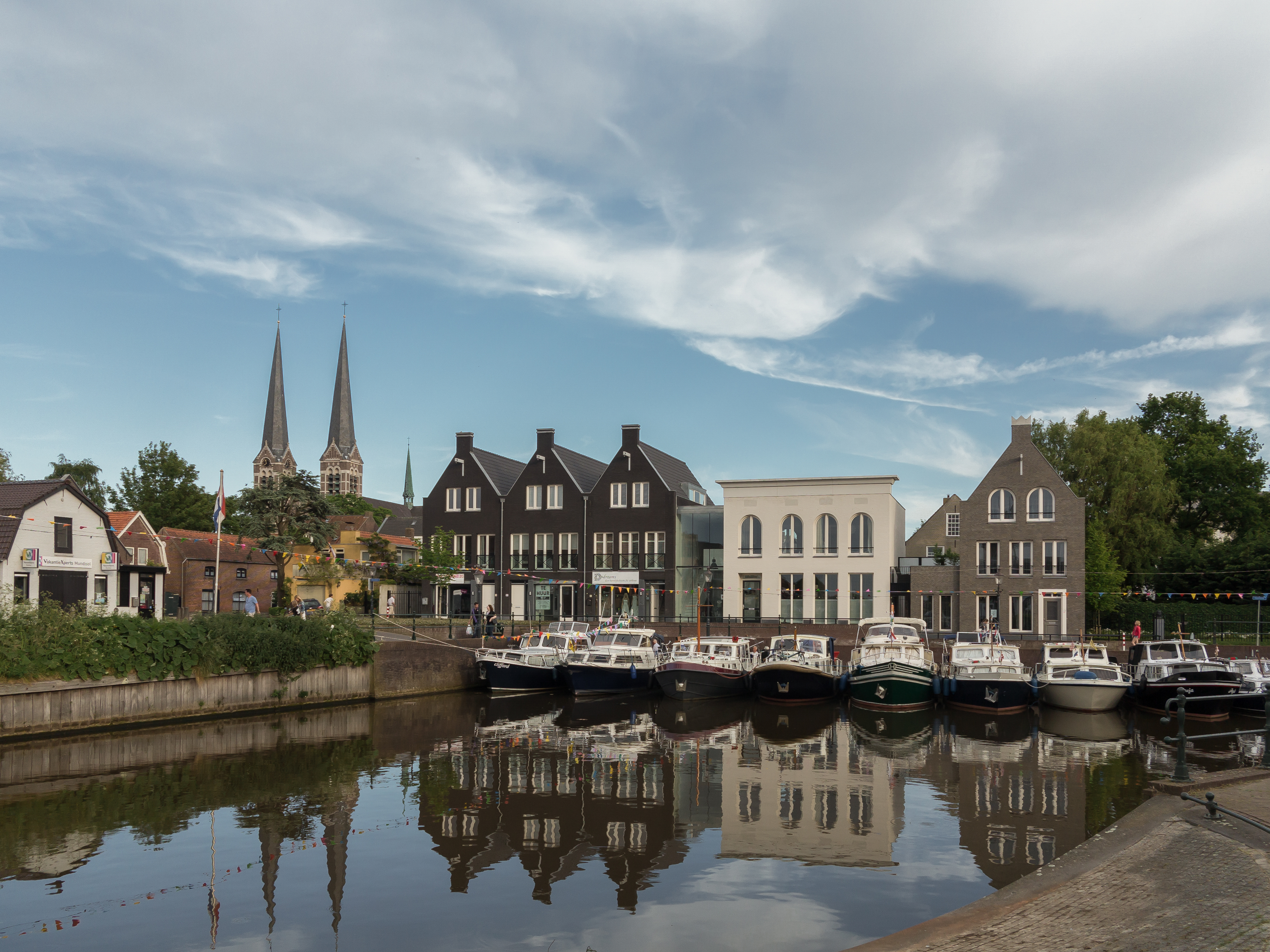
Port: de Leurse Haven

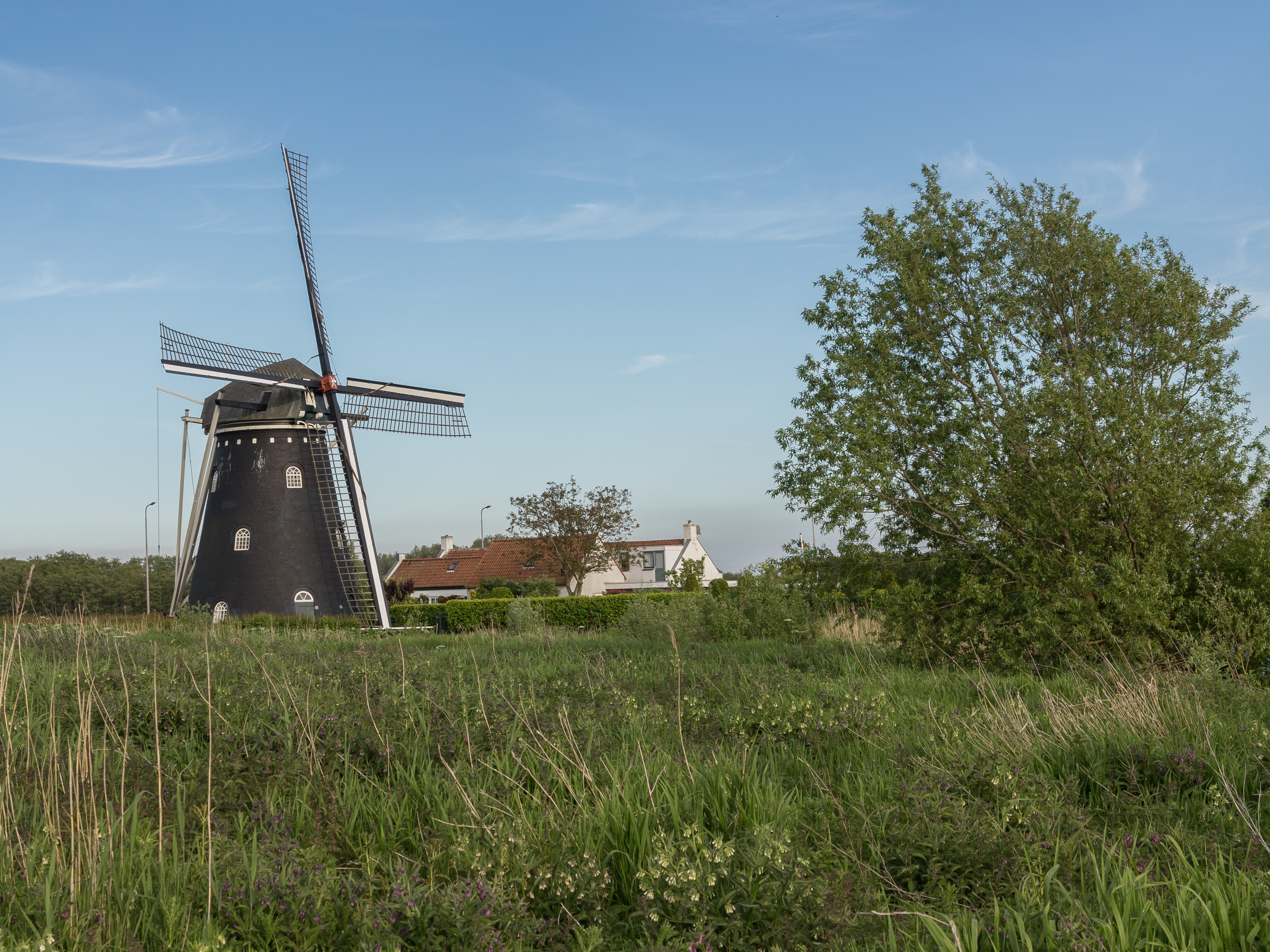
Windmill: de Zwartenbergse molen

Windmill in modern quarter

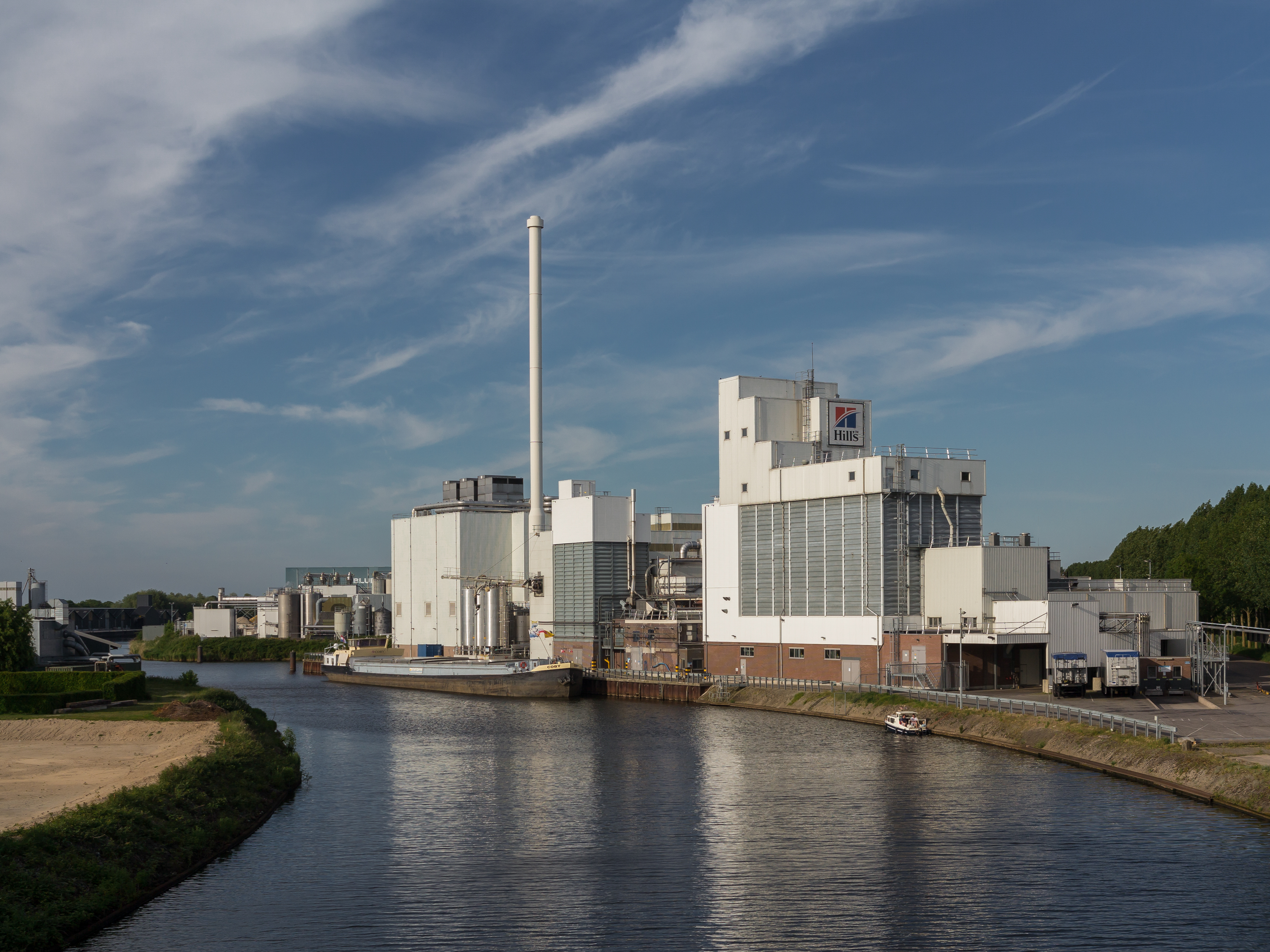
Factory (Hill's Pet Nutrition Manufacturing BV) at de Mark

== Sources ==
- Information about the history of Etten-Leur has been retrieved from the Regional Archive of Western Brabant and Info Etten-Leur
