= 414th Infantry Regiment =

414th Regiment
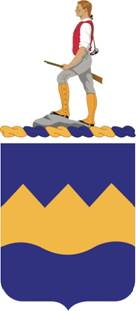
- Coat of Arms
- Active: 1921–1945; 1947–present
- Country: United States
- Branch: United States Army Reserve
- Garrison/HQ: Joint Base Lewis-McChord
- Mottos: Si Vis Pacem Para Bellum; If You Wish Peace, Prepare For War
- Engagements: World War II

Commanders
- Notable commanders: Anthony J. Touart, Gerald C. Kelleher

Insignia
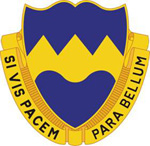
- Distinctive Unit Insignia

The 414th Regiment is a training regiment of the United States Army Reserve.

It was originally constituted as an Idaho-based Organized Reserve unit, the 414th Infantry, in 1921 during the interwar period. The 414th fought in World War II with the 104th Infantry Division and was inactivated after the end of the war. It was reactivated postwar and moved to Washington state before being reorganized as a training unit in 1959, becoming part of the 104th Division (Training).

== History ==
American infantryman of the 2nd Battalion, 414th Infantry Regiment, kneels in the rubble to draw a bead on a sniper in the burning building. Germany, November 26, 1944.

The regiment was constituted in the Organized Reserve on 24 June 1921 as the 414th Infantry, part of the Ninth Corps Area's 104th Division, which was later redesignated as the 104th Infantry Division. It was organized on 22 December 1921 with headquarters at Pocatello, Idaho. 1st Battalion was headquartered at Lewiston, 2nd Battalion at Pocatello, and 3rd Battalion at Boise. On 28 January 1930, the entire regiment was relocated to Pocatello. The 414th conducted summer training in most years with the 38th Infantry at Fort Douglas. As an alternate form of summer training, it also trained civilians at infantry Citizens' Military Training Camps at Fort Douglas or Fort Missoula in some years. Its primary ROTC feeder school was the University of Idaho.

After the United States entered World War II, the regiment was ordered into active military service on 15 September 1942 and reorganized at Camp Adair. The regiment served with the 104th in the Northern France Campaign, the Rhineland Campaign, and the Central Europe Campaign. After the end of the war, it was inactivated on 11 December 1945 at Camp San Luis Obispo, California.

The regiment was reactivated on 25 March 1947 in the Organized Reserves with headquarters at Los Angeles. The regimental headquarters was moved to Everett, Washington on 22 January 1948 and to Seattle on 1 September 1949. On 10 June 1959, it was reorganized as the 414th Regiment, part of the 104th Division (Training), with headquarters at Salem, Oregon. Between 10 January and 29 February 1968, the regiment was reorganized to consist of the 1st, 2nd, and 3rd Battalions, all part of the 104th Division (Training). On 16 April 1995, the division became the 104th Division (Institutional Training). The regiment was reorganized to consist of the 1st Battalion in the 104th Division on 16 September. Between 16 October and 16 November 1996, it was reorganized to consist of the 1st, 2nd, and 3rd Battalions of the 104th Division.

== 1st Battalion, Night Fighters ==
The 1-414th Infantry Regiment is currently an Army Reserve Drill Sergeant Unit headquartered in Eugene, Oregon. Also known as the "Night Fighters" because the First Battalion 414th Infantry was well trained and an innovator in the newly implemented "night fighting" tactics of World War 2. According to the book "The Timberwolves: The Story of the 104th Infantry Division" the 1-414th distinguished themselves when they crept through a forest to surprise the enemy on 18 November 1944.

"... moving as silently as ghosts, the battalion stole through this integral part of the Siegfried Line without a man being injured or a shot fired. Some of the fiercest fighting of the campaign followed the next day..."

No longer part of the 104th Infantry Division aka "Timberwolves" the Battalion was reassigned to the 95th Division as part of the transformation of the Army Reserve from a strategic reserve to an operational reserve force. The 95th Infantry Division also known as "Iron Men of Metz" is primarily responsible for US Army initial entry training, where the Drill Sergeant teams of 1-414th are utilized throughout the year.

In 2009/2010, elements of the 1-414th were mobilized to Fort Sill Oklahoma to conduct Basic Training for a period of one year thus continuing a long heritage of service to the United States during time of war.

== 3rd Battalion, Young Guns ==
Under the 104th Infantry Division, the 3-414th Infantry Regiment, known as the Young Guns battalion, is currently an Army Reserve Training Support Battalion with a primary mission of supporting Senior Army Reserve Officers' Training Corps, training officer candidates seeking commissions. While it has an ongoing mission to support individual cadet battalions at university campuses nationwide, it has had a standing role providing instructor committees for Leader Development and Assessment Course, currently held through the summer months at Fort Knox, Kentucky.

WWII Commanding General of the 104th Infantry Division, MG Terry de la Mesa Allen Sr., is from where 3-414 retains its motto: "Nothing in Hell can stop the Timberwolves!"

Subordinate to the 104th Infantry Division "Timberwolves," the 3-414th has companies at Joint Base Lewis-McChord and the Armed Forces Reserve Center of Vancouver, Washington.

== 4th Battalion, Golden Eagles ==
The 4th Battalion, 414th Infantry Regiment (4-414 SROTC) currently based at Joint Base Lewis-McChord, provides Army Reserve TPU Soldiers that serve as adjunct faculty with Army Reserve Officers' Training Corps programs under the US Army Cadet Command. 4-414 SROTC supports programs at colleges and universities across the western United States, including 25 states west of the Mississippi River and all the way to Guam.

Unlike traditional Army Reserve Soldiers who participate in one weekend a month unit training assemblies (UTA's), the Soldiers of 4-414 SROTC routinely teach during the week at their university or college of assignment. Reserve Soldiers provide classroom instruction in the form of lectures and written tests. Those same Soldiers provide experience and guidance during leadership labs, where theory is put into practical application in subjects such as land navigation, rifle marksmanship, and other field craft.

Cadets headed to the Army Reserve after graduation, receive mentorship and assistance in determining their Army Reserve career path. This program, United States Army Reserve (USAR) Cadet Initial Career Advocacy, provides cadets with guidance, mentorship, and contacts from experienced Army Reserve officers and Senior NCO's in choosing their branch and assignment upon commissioning and after graduation.

Subordinate to the 104th Infantry Division "Timberwolves," 4-414 SROTC is headquartered at Joint Base Lewis-McChord.

== Campaign streamers ==
Conflict	Streamer	Year(s)
World War II	Northern France	1944
World War II	Rhineland	1944-1945
World War II	Central Europe	1945
World War II	World War II Victory	None

== Symbolism ==
The shield is blue for Infantry. The dancette partition line represents the mountainous character of the State of Idaho from which state the personnel of the regiment were originally drawn. The wavy partition line represents Snake River, which runs across the southern and western portions of the state.
