= 413th Regiment (United States) =

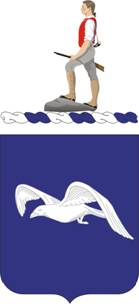
- Coat of Arms
- Active: 1921–1945; 1947–present
- Country: United States
- Branch: United States Army Reserve
- Garrison/HQ: Vancouver Barracks, Washington
- Mottos: Fortior Ex Asperis; Stronger After Difficulties
- Engagements: World War II; Global war on terrorism
- Decorations: 1st Battalion: Army Superior Unit Award, Streamer embroidered 2005–2006; 2d Battalion: Presidential Unit Citation (Army), Streamer embroidered DUREN; Army Superior Unit Award, Streamer embroidered 2005–2006

The 413th Regiment is a regiment of the United States Army Reserve. Established 24 June 1921 as the 413th Infantry, part of the Organized Reserves, it was attached to the 104th Infantry Division. The regiment was originally headquartered in Salt Lake City, Utah. Ordered into active service on 15 September 1942, the regiment saw service during World War II with campaign participation credit in Northern France, Rhineland, and Central Europe.

Inactivated during post-World War II demobilization, the regiment was reactivated 25 March 1947 as part of the Organized Reserves and headquartered in Oakland, California. Since 1947, the regiment has undergone reorganization and its headquarters have moved, with the current headquarters being at Vancouver Barracks, Washington. The regiment is still part of the 104th Infantry Division, which is now a training division for the United States Army Reserve. Most recently, the regiment has had elements activated for war on terrorism service.

== History ==
The 413th Infantry Regiment was constituted in the Organized Reserve on 24 June 1921, assigned to the 104th Division, and allotted to the Ninth Corps Area. The regiment was initiated on 25 January 1922 with the regimental headquarters at Salt Lake City, Utah. Subordinate battalion headquarters were concurrently organized as follows: 1st Battalion at Salt Lake City; 2nd Battalion at Reno, Nevada; and 3rd Battalion at Ogden, Utah. The regiment typically conducted inactive training period meetings at the Vermont Building in Salt Lake City, and conducted summer training most years with the 38th Infantry Regiment at Fort Douglas, Utah. As an alternate form of summer training, it also conducted infantry Citizens Military Training Camps some years at Fort Douglas. The primary ROTC "feeder" schools for new Reserve lieutenants for the regiment were the University of Utah and the University of Nevada.

== Lineage ==
- Constituted 24 June 1921 in the Organized Reserves as the 413th Infantry and assigned to the 104th Division (later redesignated as the 104th Infantry Division)
- Organized in January 1922 with headquarters at Salt Lake City, Utah
- Ordered into active military service 15 September 1942 and reorganized at Camp Adair, Oregon
- Trained at Camp Granite, California in 1943.
- Inactivated 13 December 1945 at Camp San Luis Obispo, California
- Activated 25 March 1947 in the Organized Reserves with headquarters at Oakland, California
- Location of headquarters changed 22 January 1948 to Portland, Oregon
- Organized Reserves redesignated 25 March 1948 as the Organized Reserve Corps; redesignated 9 July 1952 as the Army Reserve
- Reorganized and redesignated 10 June 1959 as the 413th Regiment, an element of the 104th Division (Training), with headquarters at Portland, Oregon
- Location of headquarters changed 1 November 1961 to Vancouver Barracks, Washington
- Reorganized 10 January – 29 February 1968 to consist of the 1st and 3d Battalions, elements of the 104th Division (Training)
- Reorganized 1 April 1971 to consist of the 1st, 2d, and 3d Battalions, elements of the 104th Division (Training)
- Reorganized 16 April 1995 to consist of the 1st, 2d, and 3d Battalions, elements of the 104th Division (Institutional Training)
- Elements ordered into active military service in support of the war on terrorism
- 1st and 2d Battalions released 1 October 2007 from assignment to the 104th Division (Institutional Training)
- Reorganized 16 October 2007 to consist of the 1st, 2d, and 4th Battalions, and the 3d Battalion, an element of the 104th Division (Institutional Training)
- Reorganized 15 April 2009 to consist of the 1st, 2d, and 4th Battalions
- 1st Battalion inactivated on 9 December 2016 in a ceremony held in Vancouver, WA.

== Campaign streamers ==
Conflict	Streamer	Year(s)
World War II	Northern France	1944
World War II	Rhineland	1944–1945
World War II	Central Europe	1945
World War II	World War II Victory	None

== Decorations ==
- Presidential Unit Citation, 2nd Battalion, streamer embroidered DUREN
- Army Superior Unit Award, 1st and 2nd Battalion, streamer embroidered 2005–2006

== Notable members ==
- Cecil H. Bolton, First Lieutenant, awarded the Medal of Honor
- Willy F. James, Jr., Private First Class, posthumously awarded the Medal of Honor
