= 415th Infantry Regiment =

415th Regiment
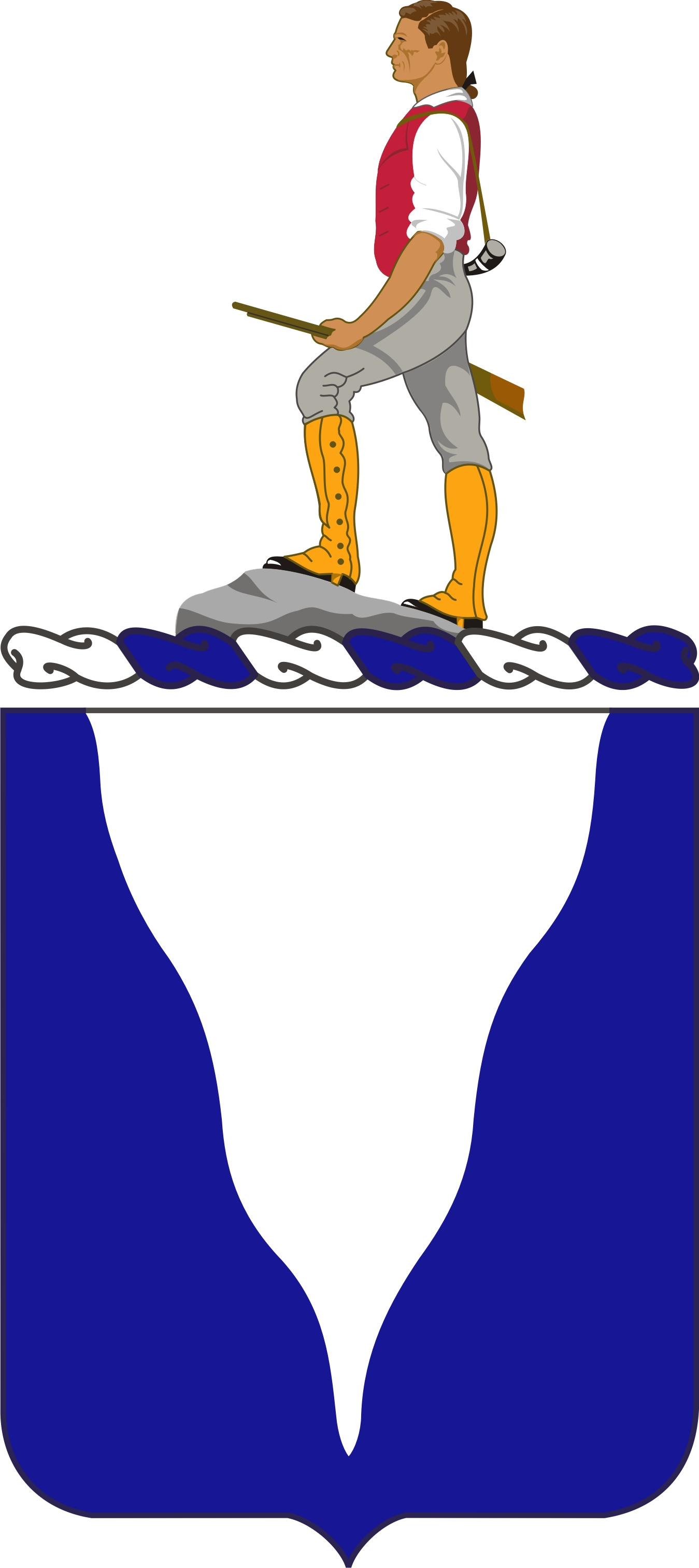
- Coat of Arms
- Active: 1921–1945; 1947–present
- Country: United States
- Branch: United States Army Reserve
- Motto: Old Faithful
- Engagements: World War II

The 415th Regiment is a regiment of the United States Army Reserve.

== Service during the World Wars ==
The 415th Infantry was constituted in the Organized Reserve on 24 June 1921, assigned to the 104th Division, and allotted to the Ninth Corps Area. The regiment was initiated on 30 January 1922 with regimental headquarters organized at Casper, Wyoming. Subordinate battalion headquarters were concurrently organized as follows: 1st Battalion at Gillette, Wyoming; 2nd Battalion at Casper; and 3rd Battalion at Laramie, Wyoming. The regimental band was organized in 1923 at Roundup, Montana, and inactivated in 1929. The entire regiment was relocated on 2 May 1930 to Casper. The regiment conducted summer training most years with the 38th Infantry Regiment at Fort Douglas, Utah, and after 1927, with units of the 2nd Division's 4th Infantry Brigade at Fort D.A. Russell/Francis E. Warren, Wyoming, and the Pole Mountain Military Reservation, Wyoming. The primary ROTC "feeder" school for new lieutenants for the regiment was the University of Wyoming. The regiment was inactivated on 27 December 1940 at Casper by relief of personnel.

It was ordered into active service on 15 September 1942, and saw service during World War II with campaign participation credit for the Northern France, Rhineland, and Central Europe campaigns.

== Service after the World Wars ==
Inactivated during post-World War II demobilization, the regiment was reactivated 12 June 1947 as part of the Organized Reserve and headquartered in Tacoma, Washington under the 104th Division. The Battalions have been realigned under the 95th Training Division and provides trained personnel to support Initial Entry Training. Most recently, the regiment have trained personnel ahead of deployments to the War in Afghanistan (2001–2021) and the War in Iraq (2003–2011).

== Lineage ==
- Constituted 24 June 1921 in the Organized Reserve as the 415th Infantry and assigned to the 104th Division (later redesignated as the 104th Infantry Division)
- Organized in January 1922 with headquarters at Casper, Wyoming
- Ordered into active military service 15 September 1942 and reorganized at Camp Adair, Oregon
- Inactivated 17 December 1945 at Camp San Luis Obispo, California
- Activated 12 June 1947 in the Organized Reserve with headquarters at Tacoma, Washington
- Reorganized and redesignated 10 June 1959 as the 415th Regiment, an element of the 104th Division (Training), with headquarters at Seattle, Washington
- Reorganized 10 January - 29 February 1968 to consist of the 1st and 2nd Battalions, elements of the 104th Division (Training)
- Reorganized 1 April 1971 to consist of the 1st, 2nd, and 3rd Battalions, elements of the 104th Division (Training)
- Reorganized 16 September 1993 to consist of the 1st, 2nd, 3rd, and 4th Battalions, elements of the 104th Division (Training)
- Reorganized 16 April 1995 to consist of the 1st, 2nd, 3rd, and 4th Battalions, elements of the 104th Division (Institutional Training)

== Campaign streamers ==
Conflict	Streamer	Year(s)
World War II	Northern France	1944
World War II	Rhineland	1944-1945
World War II	Central Europe	1945
World War II	World War II Victory	None

== Decorations ==
Ribbon	Award	Year	Subordinate Elements	Embroidered	Notes
	Presidential Unit Citation	1944	1st Battalion	Roer River Bridge Head	
	Presidential Unit Citation	1945	2nd and 3rd Battalions	Lucherberg	
	Army Superior Unit Award	1 JAN 05–31 DEC 06	All Battalions	2005-2006	Permanent Orders 147-30
