= One Station Unit Training =

Integrated training program in the United States Army

One Station Unit Training, sometimes referred to as OSUT, is a term used by the United States Army to refer to a training program in which recruits remain with the same unit and Drill Sergeants for both Basic Combat Training (BCT) and Advanced Individual Training (AIT). This streamlines the training schedule and helps to produce more camaraderie between trainees. There are a variety of Military Occupational Specialties (MOS) and training stations that have OSUT training, such as:

- 11B and 11C (Infantryman and Indirect Fire Infantryman) at Fort Benning, Georgia
- 12B (Combat Engineer) at Fort Leonard Wood, Missouri
- 12C (Bridge Crewmember) at Fort Leonard Wood, Missouri
- 19K (M1 Abrams Crewman) at Fort Benning, Georgia
- 19D (Cavalry Scout) at Fort Benning, Georgia
- 31B (Military Police) 14th Military Police Brigade at Fort Leonard Wood, Missouri

== History ==
The first OSUT was implemented in 1974.

== See also ==
- Fort McClellan
