= General Irwin =

General Irwin may refer to:

- Alexander Irwin (died 1752), British Army lieutenant general
- Alistair Irwin (born 1948), British Army lieutenant general
- George LeRoy Irwin (1868–1931), U.S. Army major general
- James Murray Irwin (1858–1938), British Army major general
- John Irwin (British Army officer) (1727/28–1788), British Army general
- Noel Irwin (1892–1972), British Army lieutenant general
- Stafford LeRoy Irwin (1893–1955), U.S. Army lieutenant general

== See also ==
- James Brailsford Erwin (1856–1924), U.S. Army brigadier general
