= Terry de la Mesa Allen Sr. =

American army officer (1888–1969)

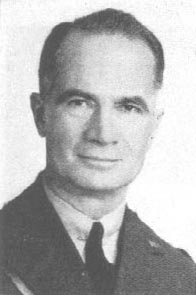
- Born: April 1, 1888; Fort Douglas, Utah, U.S.
- Died: September 12, 1969 (aged 81); El Paso, Texas, U.S.
- Military career
- Allegiance: United States
- Branch: United States Army
- Service years: 1912–1946
- Rank: Major General
- Nickname: "Terrible Terry"
- Service number: 0-3461
- Unit: Cavalry Branch
- Commands: 3rd Battalion, 358th Infantry Regiment; 3rd Cavalry Brigade; 2nd Cavalry Division; 1st Infantry Division; 104th Infantry Division
- Conflicts: Mexican Border War; World War I World War II
- Awards: Army Distinguished Service Medal (2); Croix de Guerre; Silver Star; Legion of Merit; Purple Heart (2)

Major General Terry de la Mesa Allen Sr. (April 1, 1888 – September 12, 1969) was a senior United States Army officer who fought in both World War I and World War II. Allen was a decorated World War I veteran, where he commanded an infantry battalion at the relatively young age of 30 in 1918 and was wounded twice, and, after America's entry into World War II in late 1941, he commanded the 1st Infantry Division in North Africa and Sicily from May 1942 until August 1943. He was later selected to lead the 104th Infantry Division as divisional commander, a post he held until the war's end in 1945.

== Early years ==
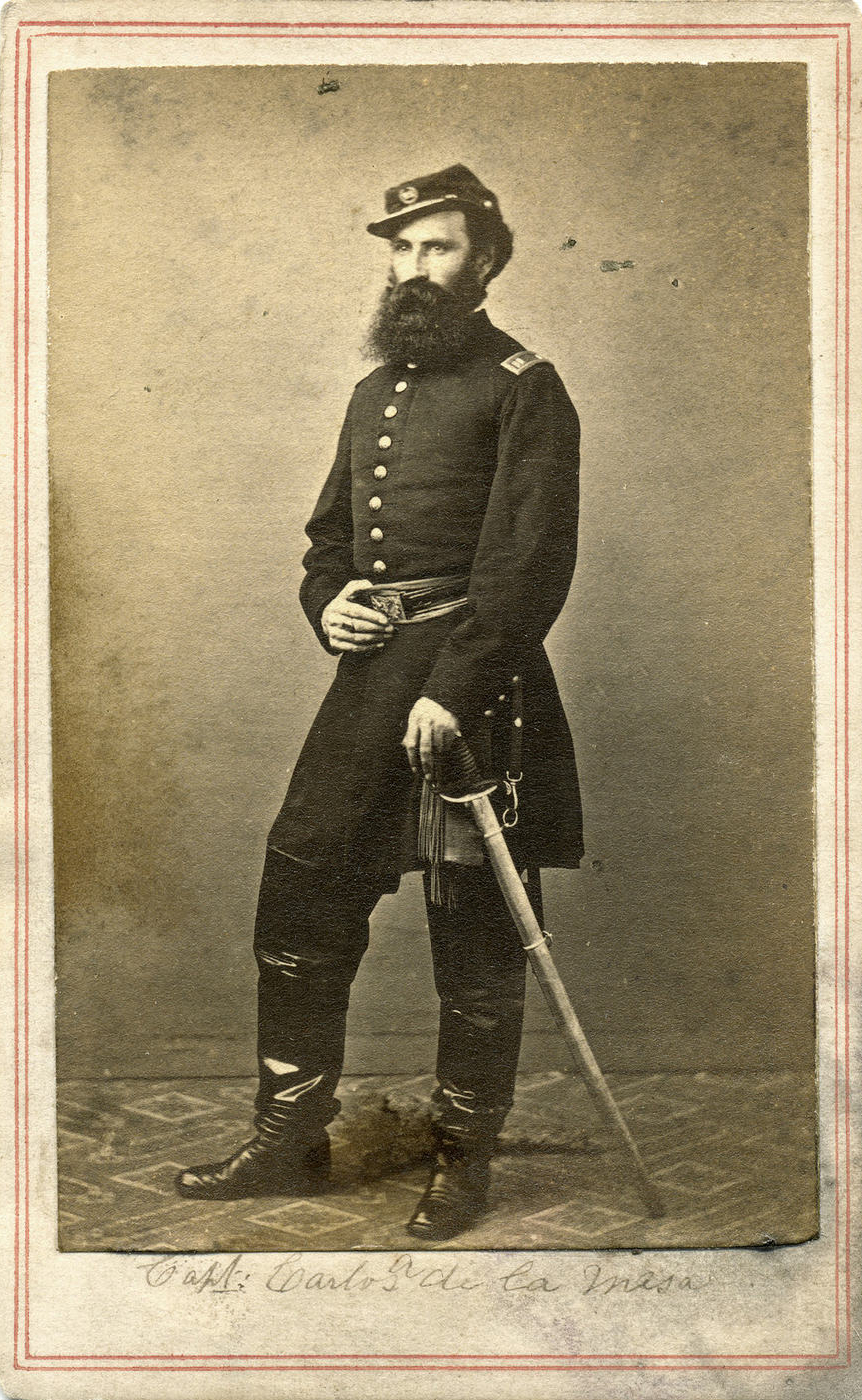
Carlos Alvarez de la Mesa

Allen was born in Fort Douglas, Utah, to Colonel Samuel Allen and Consuelo "Conchita" Alvarez de la Mesa. Allen's family had a long line of military tradition. Besides his father, Allen's maternal grandfather was Colonel Carlos Alvarez de la Mesa, a Spanish national who fought at Gettysburg for the Union Army in the Spanish Company of the "Garibaldi Guard", officially known as the 39th New York Volunteer Infantry Regiment, during the American Civil War. Allen grew up in various military bases because of his father's military career and in 1907, received an appointment to the United States Military Academy (West Point) in New York. Unlike most American World War II generals, Allen was a Catholic.

== Early military career ==
There were three certain factors which affected Allen's performance at West Point and which would lead up to his dismissal. One of them was that he began to stutter and soon fell behind in his classes. Another was that he was held back a grade in his second year because he failed mathematics. Finally, he failed an ordnance and gunnery course.

Allen enrolled and attended the Catholic University of America in Washington, D.C., and earned a Bachelor of Arts degree in 1912. He joined the United States Army once more and after passing the competitive army officers exam, was commissioned a second lieutenant in the cavalry and assigned to Fort Myer, Virginia. In 1913, he was reassigned to the 14th Cavalry Regiment at Eagle Pass, Texas, and served there until 1917. During this time, he pursued and captured ammunition smugglers and served on border duty. He was promoted twice; on July 1, 1916, to first lieutenant and on May 15, 1917, to captain, almost six weeks after the American entry into World War I.

By this time, despite being "woefully ignorant of the trench warfare of the western front", Allen had gained some valuable knowledge during his tour on the border. He had learned how to lead and to command men. He knew what it was to engage in a firefight and, having acquitted himself well, could be confident that he would perform under pressure.

During his years as the son of an officer at different encampments, he had mingled freely with the rough-hewn enlisted men and their children. Even then he held no rigid distinctions—favoring neither those who commanded nor those who followed. When he was on active duty with the 14th Cavalry, he lived in the field with the troopers, isolated from the niceties of a well-established army post, and his appreciation of fellow soldiers regardless of rank could only have been enhanced.

== World War I ==
Just over a year on from America's declaration of war on Germany and her official entrance into World War I, Allen still remained in the United States, having spent most of that time training the huge numbers of draftees that came pouring in. Desperate to escape, and fearing that he would spend the war at home training troops, he sought a transfer. He ultimately got his wish, although it was not quite in the form which he had expected, when he was assigned to the 315th Ammunition Train. The unit was attached to the 90th Division, with the key responsibility of transporting artillery ordnance to the front lines. The division's commander was Major General Henry Tureman Allen (no relation) and the division itself was scheduled to go overseas to France. Allen was ecstatic and wrote home, "I cannot understand my good fortune to jump over the heads of quite a few fellows who [out]rank me. [I] am in the artillery now and though I hate to take off the crossed sabers it's anything to get to France."

According to rumour, Allen showed up at a school for infantry officers the day before a class graduation. When the commandant of the school began to hand out certificates to the graduates, Allen lined up with them. When confronted with him, the commandant said, "I don't remember you in this class." "I'm Allen. Why don't you?" was his reply. Without further ado, Allen was given the certificate and became a temporary major.

Allen was assigned to the 3rd Battalion of the 358th Regiment, which was also part of the 90th Division which had been sent to reinforce the American Expeditionary Forces (AEF) on the Western Front. Allen led the battalion into battle at St. Mihiel in mid-September and later during the Meuse–Argonne offensive, the largest battle in the history of the U.S. Army. It was during this brief but bitter campaign that Allen began to develop his preference for night operations. "Night attacks for a comparatively short advance can be accomplished under his worst conditions. The surprise effect saves lives", he wrote.

Allen remained with the AEF in France until the Armistice of November 11, 1918. By this time, he wrote in a letter back home, "I can't help but weaken when I look at the size of some of my companies. Some of them cut down to 40% and only 3 officers left who went over the top with me at St. Mihiel. I'm using my 3rd adjutant now. Two of them were killed, poor fellows." On the day of the Armistice, although Allen and his division had received orders to halt its operations, other American units, notably the 2nd, 79th, 81st and 89th Divisions, continued attacking until 11am, when the Armistice was due to come into effect.

Allen was awarded a Silver Star and a Purple Heart for his actions during the war. The citation for his Silver Star reads as follows:

The President of the United States of America, authorized by Act of Congress July 9, 1918, takes pleasure in presenting the Silver Star to Major (Infantry) Terry DeLaMesa Allen (ASN: 0-3461), United States Army, for gallantry in action while serving with the 90th Division, American Expeditionary Forces, in action near Aincreville, France, 24 October 1918, while leading his battalion.

He then served with the Army of Occupation in Germany until 1920 when he returned to the United States.

== Between the wars ==
After Allen returned to the United States, his temporary rank of major was reverted to captain until July 1, 1920, when he was promoted to the permanent rank of major. He served in Camp Travis and later in Fort McIntosh, both located in Texas. In 1922, Allen was assigned to the 61st Cavalry Division, in New York City. He also competed in the polo tournament at the 1920 Summer Olympics, winning the bronze medal.

He continued to take military related courses, among them: an advanced course at the U.S. Army Cavalry School, Fort Riley, Kansas; a U.S. Army Command and General Staff School at Fort Leavenworth, Kansas (where he did not distinguish himself, graduating 221st out of a class of 241 while Dwight D. Eisenhower, a fellow student who, unlike Allen, had not served overseas during the recent war, graduated first); a course at the U.S. Army Infantry School at Fort Benning, Georgia and an interim course in infantry command with other divisions. It was while he was at the Infantry School that he came into contact with Lieutenant Colonel George C. Marshall, the assistant director at the school, who came to form a very high opinion of Allen, giving Allen very high marks on his efficiency report. He believed Allen was qualified to attend the U.S. Army War College and concluded his efficiency report by stating, "By training, experience and temperament, highly qualified as a leader" and "qualified as of now as commanding officer of a regiment and in wartime a division." In 1928, he married Mary Frances Robinson of El Paso, Texas with whom in 1929 he had a son, Terry Allen Jr.

In August 1934 Allen went as a student to the Army War College, from where he, together with some eighty other fellow students, graduated in June 1935. While he was there his group studied several different topics. It also dealt with a paper war game dealing with the possibility of a second global conflict. On August 1, 1935, Allen was promoted to lieutenant colonel and became an instructor at the U.S. Army Cavalry School at Fort Riley, Kansas. He wrote and published "Reconnaissance by horse cavalry regiments and smaller units" in 1939.

On October 1, 1940, during World War II (although the United States was still neutral at this point) George Marshall, now a full general and the U.S. Army Chief of Staff, promoted Allen to the rank of brigadier general (without ever holding the rank of colonel) and placed him in command of the 3rd Cavalry Brigade. From April–May 1941 he commanded the 2nd Cavalry Division. He then became the assistant division commander (ADC) of the 36th Infantry Division, an Army National Guard formation from Texas. The 36th Division was commanded by his good friend, Brigadier General Fred L. Walker, who, like Allen, was also a non-West Pointer. During this time Marshall wrote to a fellow officer, Lieutenant General Hugh A. Drum, then commanding the U.S. First Army, about Allen, describing him as "outstanding as a leader" and believing that Allen "can do anything with men and officers, though unprepossessing in appearance and apparently casual in manner."

== World War II ==
In May 1942, five months after the Japanese attack on Pearl Harbor and the subsequent German declaration of war on the United States, Allen was promoted to the rank of major general and given command of the 1st Infantry Division (also nicknamed "The Big Red One" due to its distinctive "1" insignia), a Regular Army formation. Like all divisions in the U.S. Army at the time, the 1st, having been originally organized in 1917 during World War I as a square division of four infantry regiments−in the case of "The Big Red One" these were the 16th, 18th, 26th and 28th, together with various supporting units−it had now been reorganized as a triangular division of three regiments of infantry instead of four (with the 28th Infantry Regiment transferring to the 8th Infantry Division), again with an appropriate number of supporting units.

Allen's 1st Infantry Division was soon sent to the United Kingdom where they underwent further combat training, which included training in amphibious operations. Allen and his ADC, Brigadier General Theodore Roosevelt Jr. (son of former President Theodore Roosevelt), distinguished themselves as combat leaders. Allen's brash and informal leadership style won him much respect and loyalty from the men in his division, who wholeheartedly adopted his emphasis on aggressiveness and combat effectiveness rather than military appearances. Another notable officer under his command was his chief of staff, Colonel Norman Cota, who would later become a major general and be remembered for his leadership on Omaha Beach during the invasion of Normandy on June 6, 1944, more commonly known as D-Day.

=== North Africa ===
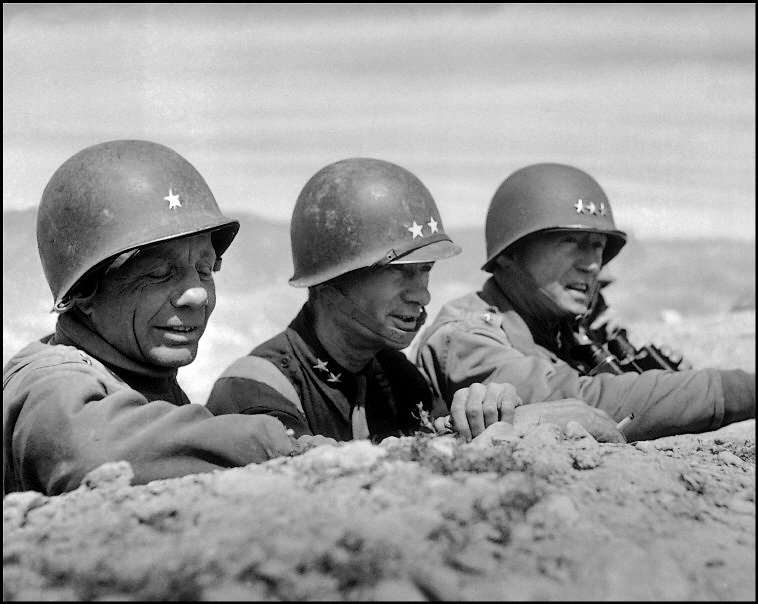
From left to right, Brigadier General Theodore Roosevelt Jr., Major General Terry Allen and Lieutenant General George S. Patton, March 1943.

The division participated in the invasion of French North Africa. The division landed in Oran, Algeria on November 8, 1942, as part of Center Task Force of Operation Torch under the command of Major General Lloyd Fredendall. By the time Torch was over, the division had suffered 418 casualties, all of them sustained in battle. Of these, 94 had paid the ultimate price, while 73 were seriously wounded, with another 178 who were slightly wounded, and 75 were missing in action. The division (and elements of the division, as it was frequently split up and spread out around French North Africa and serving under several different commands, much to Allen's displeasure) was then engaged in much severe fighting throughout most of the subsequent Tunisian campaign, notably in the run for Tunis in the immediate aftermath of Operation Torch, and later at Maktar, Medjez el Bab, Kasserine Pass, Gafsa, El Guettar, Béja, and Mateur, until May 9, 1943, helping secure Tunisia. Four days later saw the surrender of the whole of the remaining Axis forces in the country, which amounted to a total of almost 250,000 German and Italian servicemen. The final seventeen days in action in North Africa saw Allen's division suffer a total of 2000 casualties. Twenty-four infantry companies were down to less than 100 while the usual number would be between 185 and 200. Another seven companies had an even lower strength of just 50.

With the six-month campaign at an end, Allen, who oversaw the movement of his exhausted division back to Oran, found time to write to his wife and, in doing so, unburden. He wrote, "Our losses have been considerable and are saddening. Of course many wounded will be back for duty, but there are a great many who will never come back. On the whole our losses have been comparatively minor compared to the accomplishments of the division. Most of our infantry rifle companies are now down to one rifle platoon." He further wrote that, "It has been a terrific responsibility to have the division during this period. Because very frankly, we had to win and the 1st Division had to set the pace... [I] have attended mass quite frequently and have received communion quite regularly. I always pray that our plan of operations will work with the least losses to the division."

In July, 1943, the division participated in the Allied invasion of Sicily, codenamed Operation Husky. In a 3 March 1943 letter to Marshall, General Dwight D. "Ike" Eisenhower, the Supreme Allied Commander in North Africa, expressed his confidence in the 1st Infantry Division's two leaders: "Terry Allen seems to be doing a satisfactory job; so is Roosevelt."

In spite of Allen's successes, Major General Omar Bradley, the II Corps commander, was highly critical of both Allen and Roosevelt's wartime leadership style. "While the Allies were parading decorously through Tunis," Bradley wrote, "Allen's brawling 1st Infantry Division was celebrating the Tunisian victory in a manner all its own. In towns from Tunisia all the way to Arzew, the division had left a trail of looted wine shops and outraged mayors. But it was in Oran...that the division really ran amuck. The trouble began when SOS (Services of Supply) troops, long stationed in Oran, closed their clubs and installations to our combat troops from the front. Irritated by this exclusion, the 1st Division swarmed into town to 'liberate' it a second time." Bradley continued: "Despite their [prodigious] talents as combat leaders, neither Terry Allen nor Brigadier General Theodore Roosevelt Jr, the assistant division commander, possessed the instincts of a good disciplinarian. They looked upon discipline as an unwelcome crutch to be used by less able and personable commanders." Despite this, Bradley admitted that "none excelled the unpredictable Terry Allen in the leadership of troops."

=== Campaign in Sicily ===
Bradley's resentment of Allen stands in marked contrast to the opinion held by George S. Patton, the U.S. Seventh Army commander in Sicily, who had also briefly commanded II Corps after Fredendall was sacked. Although Patton and Allen frequently argued and even insulted each other, particularly when discussing tactics and leadership styles, the former recognized Allen's competence in building a fighting division. When Patton heard General Eisenhower, the Supreme Allied Commander, deliver a lecture on the 'poor discipline' of Allen's 1st Division, Patton contradicted him: "I told him he was mistaken and that anyhow no one whips a dog before putting him into a fight." Nor did personalities dissuade Patton from fighting to get the 1st Infantry Division to carry out the Gela landings in Sicily, which he had correctly surmised would be the most difficult of the Allied assault landings in Sicily. When Patton learned that the 36th (Texas) Infantry Division, commanded by Major General Fred Walker (whom Allen had served under as ADC during his time with the division from 1941−1942), was to be used instead at Gela, he protested to General Eisenhower, claiming "I want those [1st Infantry Division] sons of bitches. I won't go without them!" Patton, who also had the 3rd and 45th Infantry Divisions under his command and was reluctant to rely on green formations (the 3rd had seen some action in North Africa while the 45th, fresh from the United States, was entirely green), got his way.

With Patton occupied with the German evacuation from Messina and responding to official inquiries concerning his slapping of an enlisted soldier, Bradley used the opportunity to ask General Eisenhower permission to relieve both Allen and Roosevelt of their commands. Bradley ostensibly justified his request by stating that a change of senior command was needed in the 1st Division after the failure of the initial assault on Troina by the division. In reality, the first assault on Troina had been carried out by the 39th Infantry, a unit of Major General Manton S. Eddy's 9th Infantry Division that had been temporarily attached to Allen's 1st Division a few days prior to the attack. However, it served as a convenient pretext to relieve Allen, whose cocky and independent command style, while demonstrably effective, clashed with Bradley's idea of a commander. Even worse, in Bradley's mind, was that "the whole division had assumed Allen's cavalier attitude."

Although Bradley believed his actions caused Allen's relief, recent scholarship suggests that Allen's return to the United States was planned by Eisenhower and Patton before the Sicilian campaign began. Indeed, Eisenhower's statement on the matter from his personal papers was unequivocal: "It is a terrible injustice to General Allen to hint that he was relieved for inefficiency. The answer to this one is that I will be glad to have General Allen again as a division commander."

On August 7, 1943, Allen was succeeded as 1st Infantry Division commander by Major General Clarence R. Huebner who, like Allen, was a distinguished veteran of World War I who had served with the 1st Division throughout the war, while Roosevelt was succeeded as ADC by Willard G. Wyman. Huebner later led the division in the Normandy landings on June 6, 1944. Writing in a letter to a friend some months later, Allen held no bitterness and noted, "It was a wrench to leave the old 1st Division, in view of what we had gone through together. However, there was some consolation in knowing that the division had been successful and that in spite of minor reverses, it had won every 'round', after ten months of hard combat. Also the fact that my successor in command is an officer of outstanding ability was a source of great satisfaction."

=== 104th Infantry Division ===
Allen was featured on the cover of Time Magazine on August 9, 1943. He returned to the United States and, on October 15, 1943 he assumed his new command leading the 104th Infantry Division, known as the Timberwolf Division. The division was centered around three infantry regiments−in the case of Allen's new command these were the 413th, 414th, and 415th Infantry Regiments−together with various units in support. His predecessor in command of the 104th was Major General Gilbert R. Cook, who was described by one officer as "full of book learning. He had gone to the Command and General Staff School and he had all kinds of classroom work on the theory of training men for combat and teaching leadership." Another officer compared him with Allen, saying "Cook was theory; Allen was nuts and bolts." Despite being relieved of command of the 1st Infantry Division, Allen continued his own style of leadership. Former veterans of the division remembered him as being "Confident, stubborn, determined, and aggressive." At the same time, Allen gave orders that he would not tolerate unshaven or slovenly troops–what he termed "Mauldins" in the Timberwolf Division. This was a reference to the slovenly appearance of the 'Willy and Joe' characters in Sgt. Bill Mauldin's cartoons, regularly featured in the Army's Stars and Stripes newspaper. Brigadier General Bryant Moore, a 1917 graduate of West Point, was the 104th's ADC until February 1945 when he assumed command of the 8th Infantry Division, his place as ADC being taken by Brigadier General George A. Smith Jr. Smith, however, was killed soon after he received his new appointment and he was replaced by Brigadier General Charles T. Lanham.

While training the 104th in Arizona and Colorado, Allen stressed his own principles for combat success: "find 'em, fix 'em, fight 'em" ... "take the high ground" ... "inflict maximum damage to the enemy with minimum casualties to ourselves, night attack, night attack, night attack." The division extensively practiced night offensive operations to achieve maximum surprise and disruption of the enemy while reducing casualties from enemy artillery and machine gun fire. "Allen stressed that success in such ventures required well-disciplined troops, map-reading proficiency, orientation to night movement, and patrolling and training that taught how to maneuver in the dark without noise or confusion. Control, secrecy, and vigour in the execution were essentials". Later, one of Allen's biggest critics, Omar Bradley, wrote that Allen, "brought the only division I know of that was prepared for night combat."

Some 34,000 men ultimately ended up serving with the division under Allen, fighting for 195 consecutive days after landing in France on September 7, 1944. It was the first division to sail directly to France from New York. The division's first action came in October 1944 during the taking of Achtmaal and Zundert in the Netherlands. It then advanced through the Siegfried line to the Rhine River, crossing the Inde river into Cologne. Throughout his command of the division, Allen continued to display his independence and a hearty contempt for 'chickenshit' regulations that interfered with combat readiness, a trait which no longer seemed to infuriate his superior officers. After the 104th Division had secured its new lines, Bradley, now commanding the U.S. 12th Army Group, arrived in Cologne, Germany, to meet with Allen, stating "Terry, I'm pleasantly surprised to see these young Timberwolves of yours already ranked along with the First and the Ninth as the finest assault divisions in the ETO." Allen responded: "Brad, the First and the Ninth are in damned fast company."

The division later assisted in the encirclement of the Ruhr Pocket. Finally, it made a 350-mile sweep to the Mulde River in the heart of Germany as part of the Western Allied invasion of Germany. During the fighting on the Western Front, Allen's 104th Division displayed its night fighting prowess in several successful operations.

In June 1946, over a year after Victory in Europe Day and the end of World War II in Europe, the 104th Infantry Division returned to the United States where it was deactivated.

== Later years ==
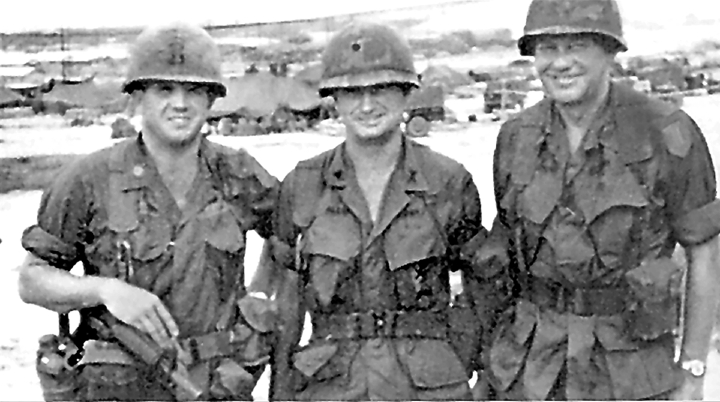
From left to right: Major James Shelton, Lieutenant Colonel Terry Allen Jr. and Sergeant Major Francis Dowling posed for a photograph. Both Allen and Dowling were killed on October 17, 1967.

Allen retired from the army on August 31, 1946. For a number of years he was employed as a representative for various insurance companies in El Paso and was active in civic affairs and in veteran organizations. In October 1967, Allen's son, Lieutenant Colonel Terry de la Mesa Allen Jr., was killed in the Vietnam War, while commanding the 2nd Battalion, 28th Infantry Regiment, a unit of the 1st Infantry Division, which his father had commanded in World War II.

His health having declined very quickly after the death of his son, his only child, he developed a heart condition, which was worsened by several small strokes, which he himself described as, "Going in and out of reality." Allen Sr., died of natural causes on September 12, 1969, in El Paso, Texas, at the age of 81. He was buried, with his son and wife, in the Fort Bliss National Cemetery.

== Honors ==
The United States Military Academy presents the "General Terry de la Mesa Allen Award" to the student with the highest rating in Military Science.

In February 1972, a community center in Fort Bliss was named for him. Although the building, adjacent to the Fort Bliss and Old Ironsides Museum, no longer functions as a community center, the dedication plaque was refurbished in late 2013 and remains as a tribute to Allen.

== Command style ==
From all reports, Allen was not only respected but was warmly regarded by his troops of his 1st Infantry Division, particularly the enlisted men. Like General George Patton, Allen's superior for much of the war, Allen generally placed his headquarters far forward, as close to the front line as possible. Unlike Patton, however, Allen did not bother greatly with his military appearance, frequently going without clean uniforms and haircuts. He was also reportedly the only American general officer in the European and North African theaters who preferred to sleep on the ground, rather than on a cot or in a bed. However, despite a casual attitude toward his own personal appearance, Allen did not tolerate slovenliness or incompetence in the troops under his command. He expected his soldiers to keep their weapons and equipment in perfect working order and trained the men constantly to keep them combat ready.

As war correspondent Ernie Pyle, who was later killed in action, would write, "Major General Terry Allen was one of my favorite people. Partly because he didn't give a damn for hell or high water; partly because he was more colorful than most; and partly because he was the only general outside the Air Forces I could call by his first name. If there was one thing in the world Allen lived and breathed for, it was to fight. He had been all shot up in the last war, and he seemed not the least averse to getting shot up again. This was no intellectual war with him. He hated Germans and Italians like vermin, and his pattern for victory was simple: just wade in and murder the hell out of the low-down, good-for-nothing so-and-so's" Allen also frequently referred to the enemy as "squareheads", "krauts", "boche", or "wops."

In preparing his 1st Infantry Division for its first encounter with the enemy, Major General Allen emphasized realistic training exercises, weapons practice, and physical conditioning in the field in place of drill and military ceremony. He felt that the more time his men spent in training realistically, the better prepared they would be for combat with the highly trained and professional German Army. Allen had a distinct preference for night assaults, which he believed caused fewer casualties, and much time and effort was devoted to company and battalion-size night movements.

Another officer, Albert Schwartz, believed Allen was a master of instilling confidence in his organization, which extended to even the lowest private. He stated that Allen "would be up front with them, he'd be in regimental headquarters in a battle, go down to battalion HQ, sometimes would even get up to company HQ. Major generals aren't supposed to do that. They are supposed to be more valuable than us punk kids who were out there as cannon fodder."

== Dates of rank ==
Insignia	Rank	Component	Date
No insignia	Cadet	United States Military Academy	June 15, 1907
No pin insignia at the time	Second lieutenant	Regular Army	November 30, 1912 (effective March 3, 1913)
	First lieutenant	Regular Army	July 1, 1916
	Captain	Regular Army	May 15, 1917
	Major	National Army	June 7 (effective June 9), 1918
	Captain	Regular Army	Reverted to permanent rank March 15, 1920
	Major	Regular Army	July 1, 1920
	Lieutenant colonel	Regular Army	August 1, 1935
	Brigadier general	Army of the United States	October 1 (effective October 2), 1940
	Major general	Army of the United States	June 19, 1942
	Colonel	Regular Army	July 1, 1942
	Major general	Regular Army, Retired	August 31, 1946

== Military awards and recognitions ==
Among Major General Terry de la Mesa Allen Sr.'s military awards and recognitions are the following:

1st Row	Army Distinguished Service Medal with oak leaf cluster		Silver Star
2nd Row	Legion of Merit	Purple Heart with oak leaf cluster	Mexican Border Service Medal
3rd Row	World War I Victory Medal	Army of Occupation of Germany Medal	American Defense Service Medal
4th Row	American Campaign Medal	European-African-Middle Eastern Campaign Medal with six campaign stars	World War II Victory Medal
5th Row	Army of Occupation Medal	Honorary Companion of the Order of the Bath - United Kingdom	Legion of Honor - France
6th Row	Croix de Guerre with bronze palm - France	St Mihiel Medal - France	Order of Suvorov Second Class - Union of Soviet Socialist Republics

== See also ==
- Hispanic Americans in World War II

== Notes ==
Military offices
Preceded by Newly activated organization	Commanding General 2nd Cavalry Division; April–May 1941	Succeeded by John Millikin
Preceded by Donald C. Cubbison	Commanding General 1st Infantry Division; 1942–1943	Succeeded by Clarence R. Huebner
Preceded by Gilbert R. Cook	Commanding General 104th Infantry Division; 1944–1945	Succeeded by Post deactivated
