= 452nd Anti-Aircraft Artillery Battalion (United States) =

Military unit

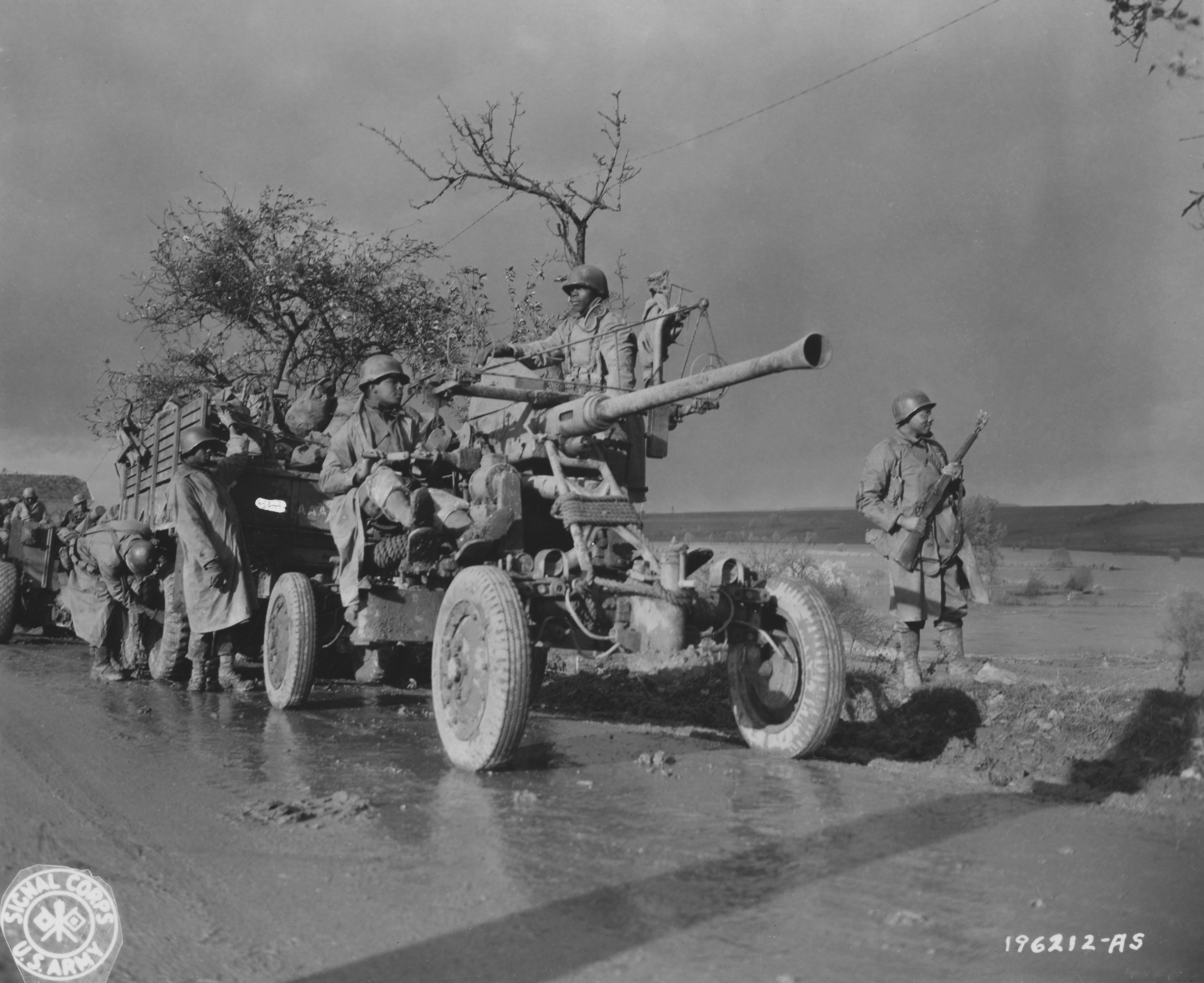
Members of Battery A, 452nd AA stand by and check their equipment while the convoy takes a break. November 9, 1944.

The 452nd Anti-Aircraft Artillery battalion was an all-African-American mobile anti-aircraft artillery unit of the US Army during the Second World War and used the motto ‘We Guard the Skyways’. On 1 January 1944, the unit had 37 officers and 736 enlisted men. The officers were white, while the enlisted men were all Black Americans. Equipped with the 40mm Bofors gun and the .50mm Quadmount, the unit is credited with 67 11/12th confirmed kills, 19 probably destroyed and 11 enemy aircraft damaged.

The 452nd "AAA" fought in nearly every major Allied land campaign in the European Theater of Operations, including Normandy, Northern France, Ardennes-Alsace, Rhineland and Central Europe. The 452nd AAA landed in Normandy on June 23, 1944. The 452nd AAA also participated in the Battle of the Bulge and was a part of General Patton's famous rescue of the besieged town of Bastogne. In its participation in the defense of a bridge crossing of the Rhine River near Oppenheim on 22 March 1945, the 452nd shot down many attacking German planes and during one 24 hour period destroyed 10.

Prior to the invasion of France, the 452nd was deployed in England to defend supply depots. In August 1944 the unit was assigned to the XII Corps and primarily used to defend field artillery battalions against enemy air attack. Several white soldiers of units protected by the 452nd AAA praised the soldiers for their protection and had good relations with them.

Five soldiers in the unit were awarded the Silver Star Medal for their valor in combat. When a field artillery battery, to which a platoon of the 452nd AAA was assigned, came under enemy fire, the unit retreated. Two soldiers of the 452nd AAA remained behind and gave aid to the wounded, thus earning the Silver Star Medal. In December 1944, three soldiers evacuated wounded soldiers of the 731st Field Artillery Battalion and allowed the unit to continue with its firing mission. For their actions, the three were awarded the Silver Star Medal.
