= Bernard J. D. Irwin =

United States Army Medal of Honor recipient (1830–1917)

Bernard John Dowling Irwin
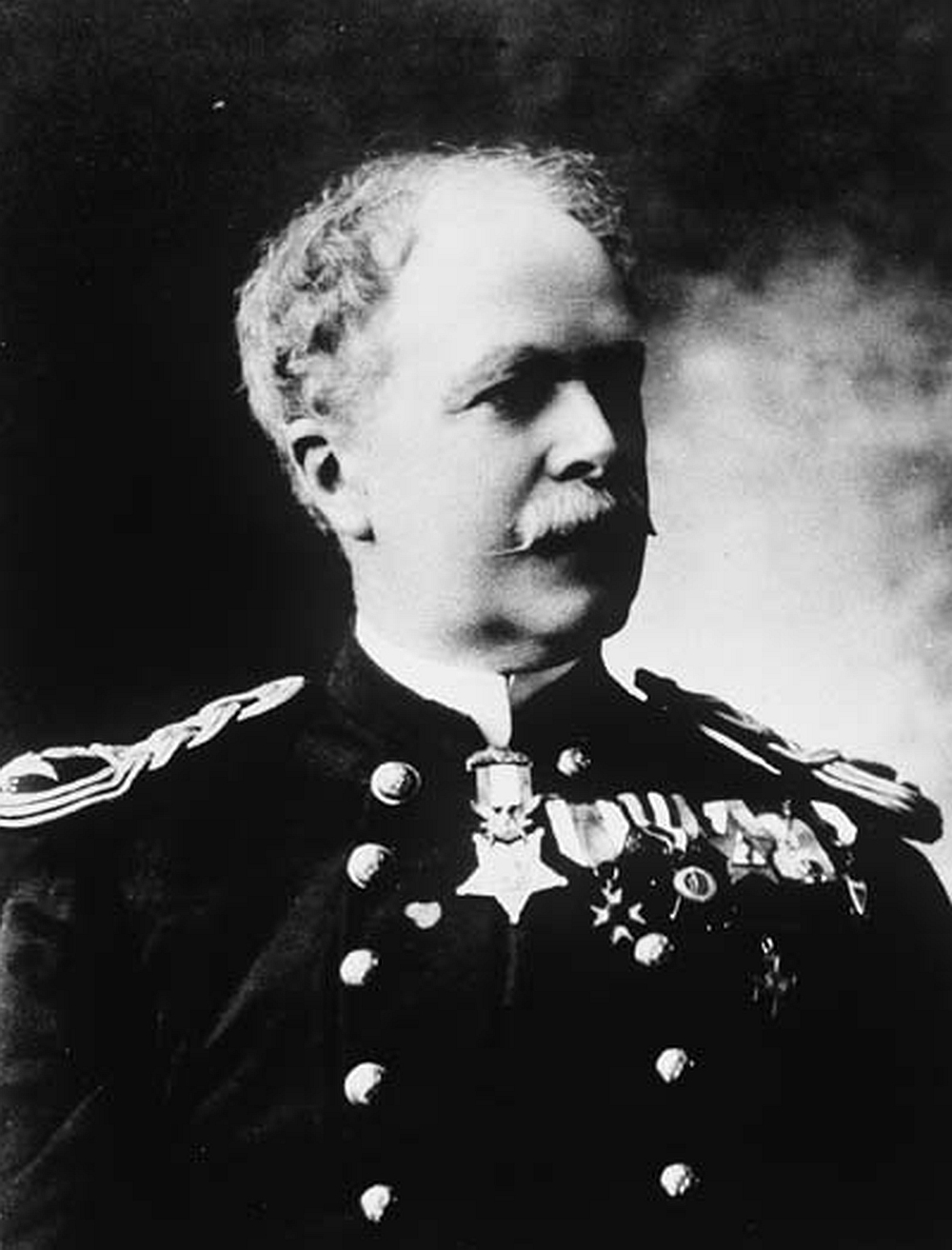
- Bernard J. D. Irwin, Medal of Honor recipient
- Born: June 24, 1830; County Roscommon, Ireland
- Died: December 15, 1917 (aged 87); Cobourg, Canada
- Burial place: West Point Cemetery
- Relatives: George LeRoy Irwin (son) Stafford LeRoy Irwin (grandson) Robert R. McCormick (son-in-law)
- Military career
- Allegiance: United States of America
- Branch: United States Army
- Service years: 1856–1894
- Rank: Brigadier general
- Conflicts: Apache Wars; Bascom Affair; American Civil War; Battle of Shiloh; Battle of Richmond
- Awards: Medal of Honor

Bernard John Dowling Irwin (June 24, 1830 – December 15, 1917) was an assistant army surgeon during the Apache Wars and the first (chronologically by action) Medal of Honor recipient. His actions on February 13, 1861, are the earliest for which the Medal of Honor was awarded.

Irwin had an interest in natural history and while at Fort Buchanan, Arizona, in 1858–1860 he collected reptile specimens for the Smithsonian Institution. In 1857 Irwin donated a meteorite to the Smithsonian Institution that came to be known as the Irwin-Ainsa (Tucson) meteorite.

A collection of his papers is held at the National Library of Medicine

== Early life ==
Irwin was born in County Roscommon, Ireland, and immigrated with his parents to the United States in the 1840s. He attended New York University from 1848 to 1849, and served as a Private in the New York Militia. In 1850, he entered Castleton Medical College, but later transferred to New York Medical College, where he graduated in 1852. He served as a surgeon and physician at the State Emigrant Hospital on Ward's Island until he was appointed an assistant surgeon to the U.S. Army in 1856.

== Cochise rescue mission ==
In early 1861, the Chiricahua Apache chief Cochise and a group of Apache warriors kidnapped a boy and a small group of U.S. soldiers in the Arizona Territory after the Army had captured Cochise's brother and nephews. When the Army refused to make a prisoner exchange, Cochise killed his prisoners. Soldiers then killed Cochise's brother and nephews. Second Lieutenant George Nicholas Bascom led a group of 60 men from the 7th Infantry after Cochise but was soon besieged, prompting a rescue mission by the army.

In response to the siege of Bascom and his men, Irwin set out on a rescue mission with 14 men of the 1st Dragoons. He was able to catch up with the Apaches at Apache Pass in present-day Arizona. He strategically placed his small unit around Cochise and his men, tricking the Apache leader into thinking that Irwin had a much larger army with him. The Apaches fled and Bascom and his men were saved. Bascom and his men joined Irwin and together they were able to track Cochise into the mountains and rescue the young boy that Cochise had captured previously.

The Irwin-Bascom matter was dramatized in an episode called "The Hero of Apache Pass", which was broadcast during the 1966 season of the syndicated television anthology series, Death Valley Days, hosted by Robert Taylor. Actor Charles Bateman was cast as Irwin.

=== Medal of Honor ===
The Medal of Honor did not exist during the time of the Bascom Incident and would not be established until a year later in 1862. However, the actions of Irwin were remembered and he was awarded the Medal of Honor just before his retirement on January 24, 1894. Irwin's actions were the earliest for which the Medal of Honor was awarded, pre-dating the outbreak of the American Civil War.

== Later military career ==
Irwin subsequently served with the army during the American Civil War. He was promoted to captain in August 1861 and the next year was appointed medical director under Major General William "Bull" Nelson. He improvised one of the first field hospitals used by the US Army at the Battle of Shiloh on April 7, 1862.

He was captured during the Battle of Richmond while attempting to save the wounded Nelson. He was promoted to major in September 1862, and after his release the following month he became medical director in the Army of the Southwest. From 1863 to 1865, he was superintendent of the military hospital in Memphis, Tennessee, and in March of the latter year was brevetted to the rank of colonel.

He was a companion of the California Commandery of the Military Order of the Loyal Legion of the United States and the Order of the Indian Wars of the United States.

After the war, Irwin served as a senior medical officer at several posts, including at West Point from 1873 to 1878. He received promotions to lieutenant colonel in September 1885 and to colonel in August 1890. He retired shortly after his 64th birthday and was promoted to brigadier general on the retired list in April 1904.

Irwin lived in Chicago, and he died at his country home in Cobourg, Canada, on December 15, 1917.

== Family ==
Coat of Arms of Bernard J. D. Irwin

His son George LeRoy Irwin (graduated from West Point in 1889) served in World War I and became a Major General in the Army. His grandson Stafford LeRoy Irwin (graduated from West Point in 1915) served in World War II and became a Lieutenant General in the Army.

His daughter, Amy Irwin Addams McCormick, was a nurse with the American Red Cross during World War I and married Robert R. McCormick in 1915.

== Awards ==
- Medal of Honor
- Civil War Campaign Medal
- Indian Campaign Medal
- Spanish War Service Medal

== See also ==
- List of Medal of Honor recipients
