= Gilbert R. Cook =

United States Army general (1889–1963)

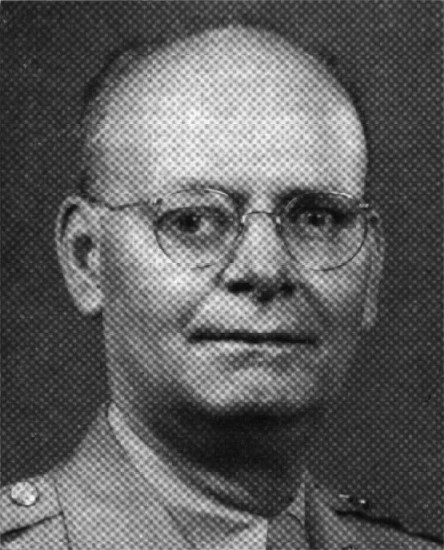
- Born: December 30, 1889; Texarkana, Arkansas, United States
- Died: September 19, 1963 (aged 73); La Jolla, California, United States
- Burial place: Arlington National Cemetery, Virginia, United States
- Spouse: Doris Frederick (m. 1914; died 1936)
- Military career
- Allegiance: United States
- Branch: United States Army
- Service years: 1912-1949
- Rank: Major General
- Nickname: "Doc"
- Service number: 0-3756
- Unit: Infantry Branch
- Commands: 21st Infantry Regiment; 104th Infantry Division; XII Corps
- Conflicts: World War I; World War II; Attack on Pearl Harbor
- Awards: Army Distinguished Service Medal; Legion of Honour (France); Croix de Guerre (France)

Gilbert Richard Cook (December 30, 1889 – September 19, 1963) was a senior United States Army officer. He had a 36-year military career and served in both World War I and World War II. During World War I he served in France and Germany, and commanded the 104th Infantry Division, and the XII Corps during World War II.

== Early career ==
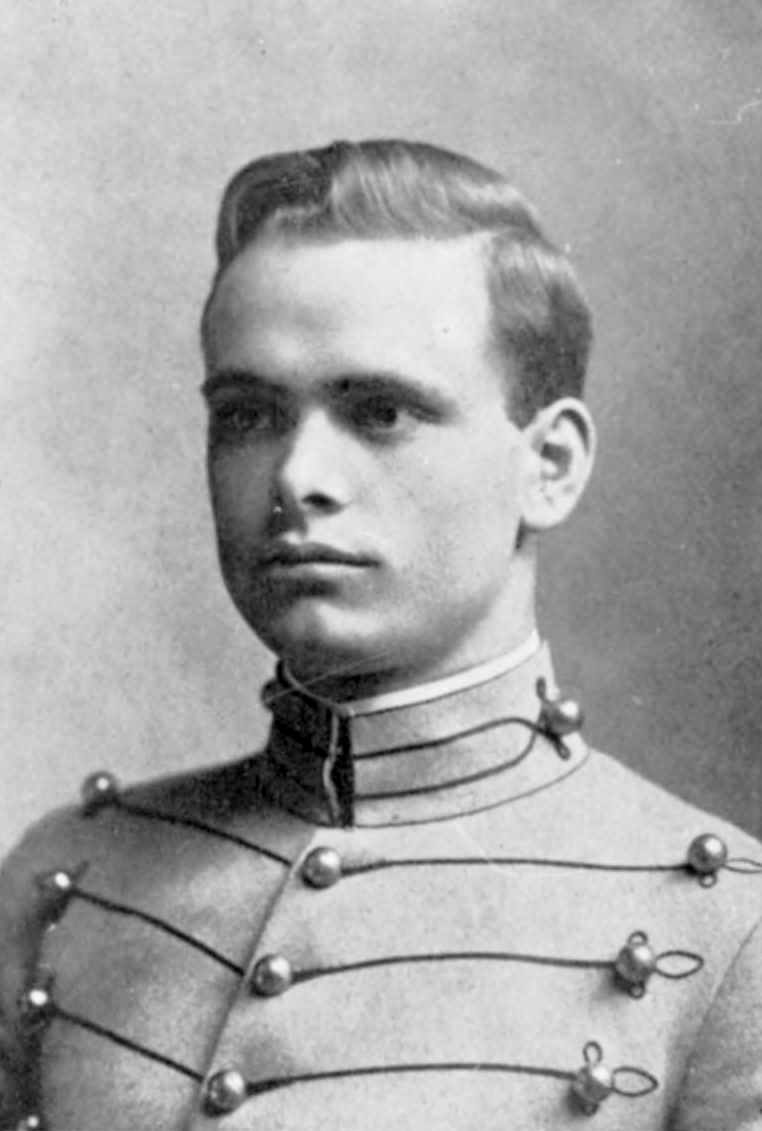
At West Point in 1912

Cook was born in Texarkana, Arkansas. He graduated from the United States Military Academy at West Point in 1912 and was commissioned a second lieutenant of Infantry. Among his fellow graduates were Wade H. Haislip, Walter M. Robertson, Walton Walker, Raymond O. Barton and Millard Harmon, all of whom were future generals.

He served on the Mexican Border in Arizona, New Mexico and Texas from 1912 to 1915. He married Doris Frederick on September 2, 1914, at Fort Sam Houston, Texas. In 1914, he served in the Panama Canal Zone and the Philippine Islands, then returned to the W.R. General Hospital in October 1915 from Panama. In June 1916 he reported to Fort Benjamin Harrison, Indiana, for duty in mustering the National Guard for border patrol duty, and in July 1917, three months after the American entry into World War I, went to Jefferson barracks, Missouri, for duty in recruiting.

== World War I ==
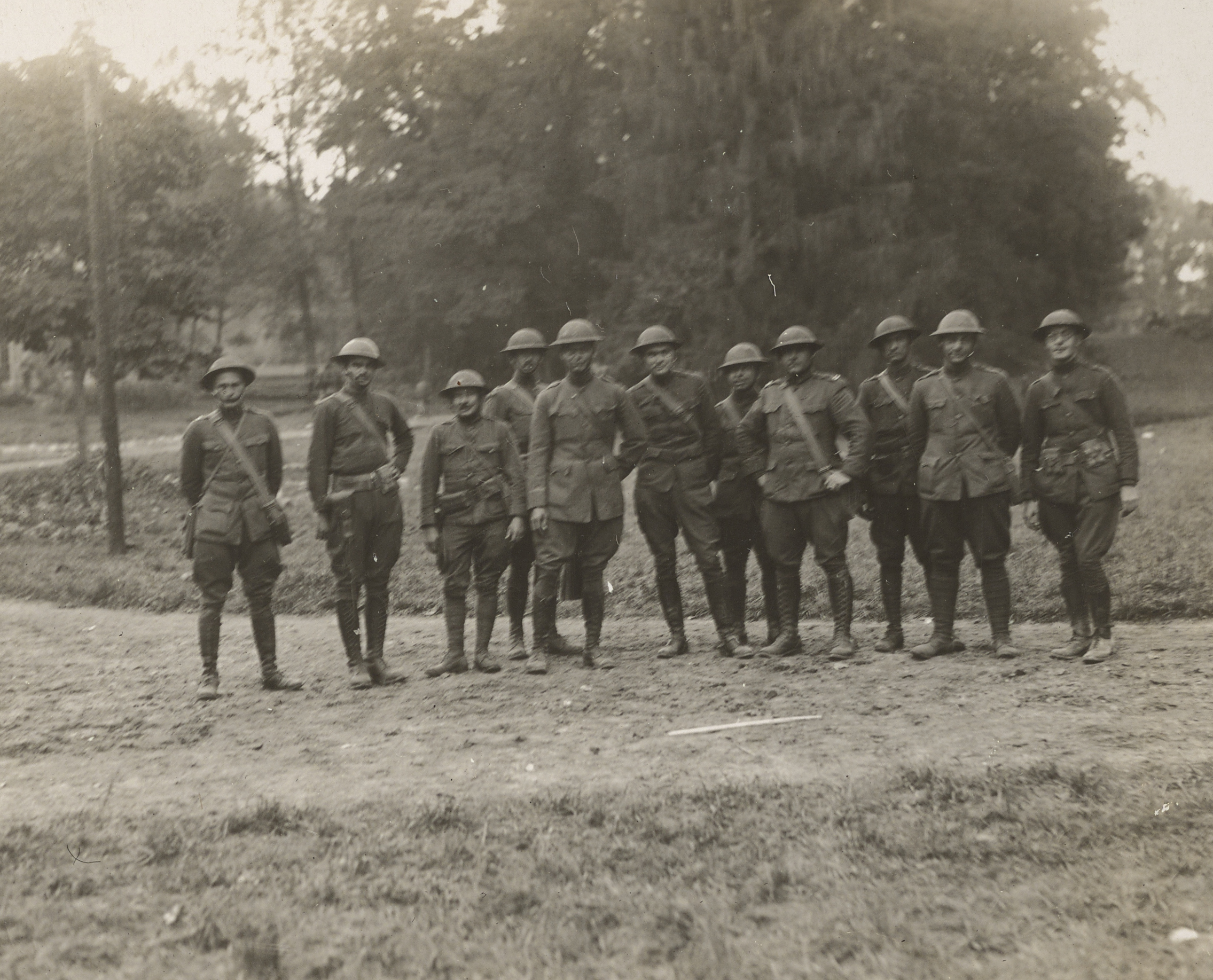
Officers of the 2nd Battalion, 58th Infantry, 4th Division, France, August 5, 1918. The battalion's commander, Major Gilbert R. Cook, is stood fourth from the left.

In April, 1918, he joined the 58th Infantry, part of the 4th Division, and went to France with that regiment in May 1918. He served at Saint-Mihiel, Meuse-Argonne, Aisne-Marne, Vesle River and Marne-Ourcq engagements. He received the Silver Star with Oak Leaf Cluster and the Croix de Guerre for bravery. He returned to the States in August 1919, after serving with the 58th Infantry in the American Forces in Germany.

== Between the wars ==
He taught at the United States Army Infantry School at Fort Benning, Georgia, from October 1919 to July 1921, when he returned to Germany for duty with the 8th Infantry at Coblenz until March 1923. Upon his return, he served at Fort Screven, Georgia and Fort McPherson, Georgia, until August 1924. He entered the Command and General Staff School at Fort Leavenworth, Kansas, and finished in June, 1925 as a "distinguished graduate". He then went to Georgia School of Technology as professor of military science and tactics, and served there until July 1926. He then returned to Fort Benning, Georgia, as an instructor in the Infantry School through 1930. In September of that year, he entered the Tank School at Fort George G. Meade, Maryland, and was graduated in June, 1931. He then entered the Army War College in Washington, D.C., and was graduated in June 1932. He next was assigned to the 12th Infantry at Fort Washington, Maryland, until September 1932, when he joined the War Department General Staff in Washington, D.C., for duty in the Operations and Training Division, G-3. After being promoted to lieutenant colonel on August 1, 1935, he became commanding officer of Fort Washington, Maryland, in September 1936. In September, 1938 he was appointed chief of Attack Section and later chief of Command Section at the Command and General Staff School at Fort Leavenworth, Kansas, and served there until 1941.

== World War II ==
On January 1, 1941, he was promoted to the temporary rank of colonel which, three months later, was made permanent. In April Cook went to Schofield Barracks, Hawaii, as commanding officer of the 21st Infantry. He commanded the 21st Infantry Regiment in the Pearl Harbor attack, for which he was awarded the Combat Infantryman Badge. In April 1942, he was assigned to the 25th Infantry Division as assistant division commander (ADC). On May 23 he was promoted again, now to the temporary rank of brigadier general.

In June 1942 he was designated as commanding general (CG) of the 104th Infantry Division and returned to the mainland. Cook was promoted to major general and reported with the divisional cadre to Camp Adair, Oregon, in August 1942 and the division was officially activated in December. He was further promoted on August 10 to major general, having been a brigadier general less than three months. His ADC was Brigadier General Bryant Moore, who later commanded the 8th Infantry Division in Western Europe. Cook conducted the training of this division through its army maneuver series.

In October 1943, he was appointed Commanding General, XII Corps at Fort Jackson, South Carolina, and conducted its training in the Tennessee maneuver area and Camp Forrest, Tennessee. He accompanied the Corps Headquarters in its move to England, where the corps was assigned to the Third Army, with Cook serving as deputy commander of 3rd Army (1943–44). He was in the Normandy and Northern France campaigns, and received the Army Distinguished Service Medal, Legion of Honor and Croix de Guerre for his services. He was cited for the Distinguished Service Medal due to the capture of Châteaudun and Orléans.

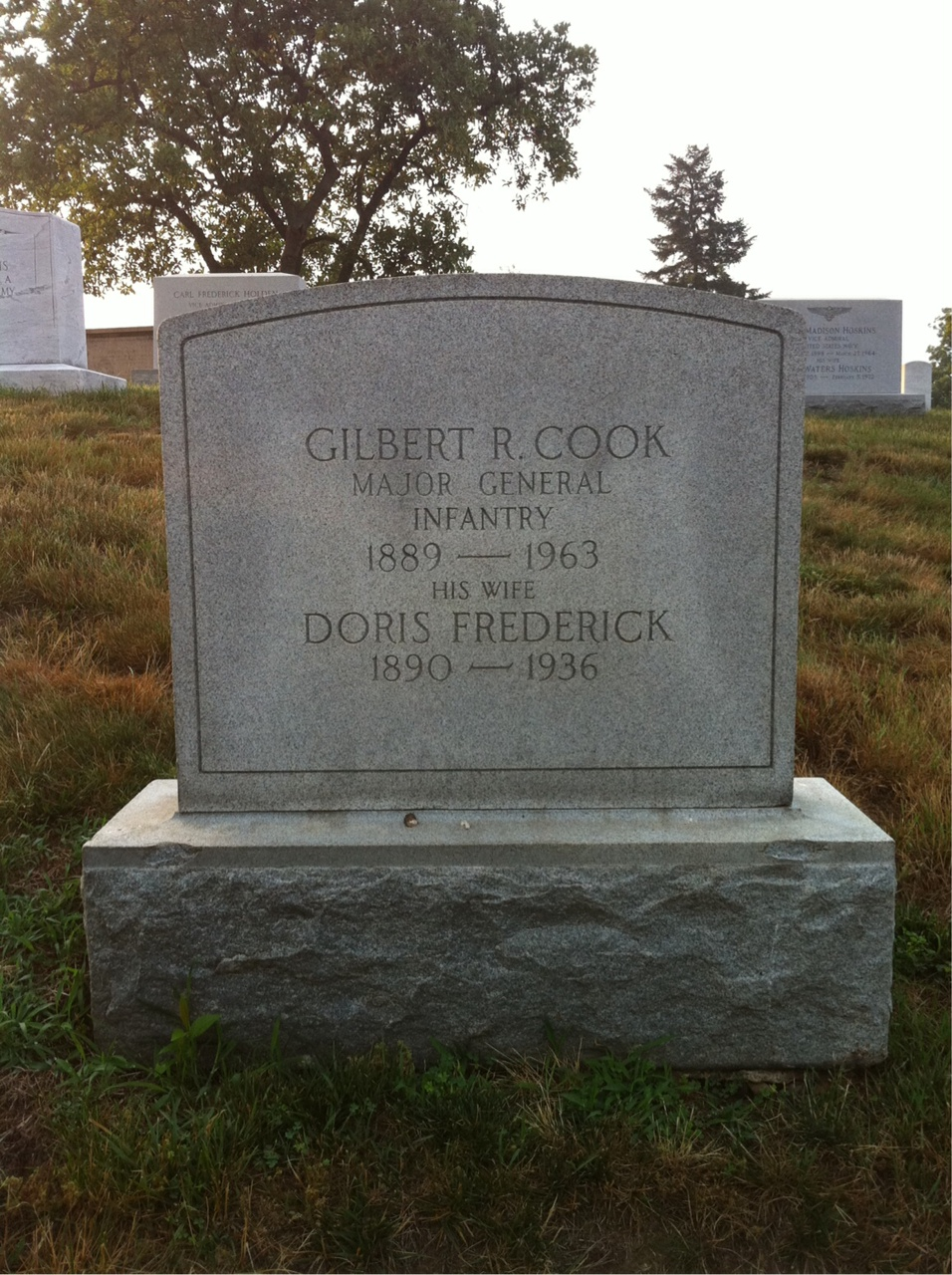
Grave at Arlington National Cemetery

His role as a field commander was cut short in August 1944, shortly after the Third Army's breakout in France, when he was hospitalized for illness due to circulation problems in his legs. As one of Patton's biographers later wrote, "to have to deprive (Cook) of his command at the very climax of his career shook Patton to the core, realising as he did the mortal blow he was delivering to his old friend." It prompted Patton to request General Dwight D. Eisenhower to award Cook the Army Distinguished Service Medal. Cook returned to the US for recuperation and less strenuous duty.

Between 1944 and 1949 he was involved in a number of boards, groups, and studies. He was a member of the Army's Equipment Review Board in 1945. He was a member of the Chief of Staff's Advisory Group (1946–1948), the Army Ground Force Postwar Planning Group, and the Haislip Review Board which studied such subjects as military organization, mobilization, universal military training, and training. Cook was called out of retirement to critique major war games in 1948 and 1955.

Cook died in La Jolla, California, on September 19, 1963, and is buried alongside his wife, Doris, in Arlington National Cemetery, in Arlington, Virginia.

== Bibliography ==
- Essame, Hubert (1998). Patton. Da Capo Press. ISBN 0-938289-99-3.
- Ripley, Tim (2003). Patton Unleashed. MBI Publishing Company. ISBN 0-7603-1447-0.
- Taaffe, Stephen R. (2013). Marshall and His Generals: U.S. Army Commanders in World War II. Lawrence, Kansas: University Press of Kansas. ISBN 978-0-7006-1942-9. OCLC 840162019.

Military offices
Preceded by Newly activated organization	Commanding General 104th Infantry Division; 1942–1943	Succeeded by Terry Allen
Preceded by William Hood Simpson	Commanding General XII Corps; 1943–1944	Succeeded by Manton S. Eddy
