= Stafford LeRoy Irwin =

US Army general (1893–1955)

Stafford L. Irwin
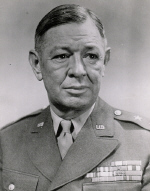
- Lieutenant General Stafford LeRoy Irwin in 1946
- Born: February 23, 1893; Fort Monroe, Virginia, United States
- Died: November 23, 1955 (aged 62); Asheville, North Carolina, United States
- Burial place: Arlington National Cemetery, Virginia, United States
- Spouses: Helen Hall (m. 1921; died 1937) Clare Moran (m. 1941)
- Relatives: Bernard J. D. Irwin (Grandfather); George LeRoy Irwin (Father)
- Military career
- Allegiance: United States
- Branch: United States Army
- Service years: 1915–1952
- Rank: Lieutenant General
- Nickname: "Red"
- Service number: O-3803
- Units: Cavalry Branch; Field Artillery Branch
- Commands: 72nd Field Artillery Regiment; 5th Infantry Division; XII Corps; V Corps
- Conflicts: Mexican Punitive Expedition; World War I World War II
- Awards: Army Distinguished Service Medal; Legion of Merit (2); Silver Star; Bronze Star (2)

Lieutenant General Stafford LeRoy Irwin (March 23, 1893 – November 23, 1955) was a senior United States Army officer who served in World War II. He came from a family with a strong military tradition: he was the son of Major General George LeRoy Irwin—for whom Fort Irwin, California, is named—while his grandfather, Brigadier General Bernard J. D. Irwin, was a recipient of the Medal of Honor. After General Manton Eddy resigned from his position due to health issues, Irwin commanded the XII Corps from April 20, 1945, through the end of the war.

== Early life and military career ==
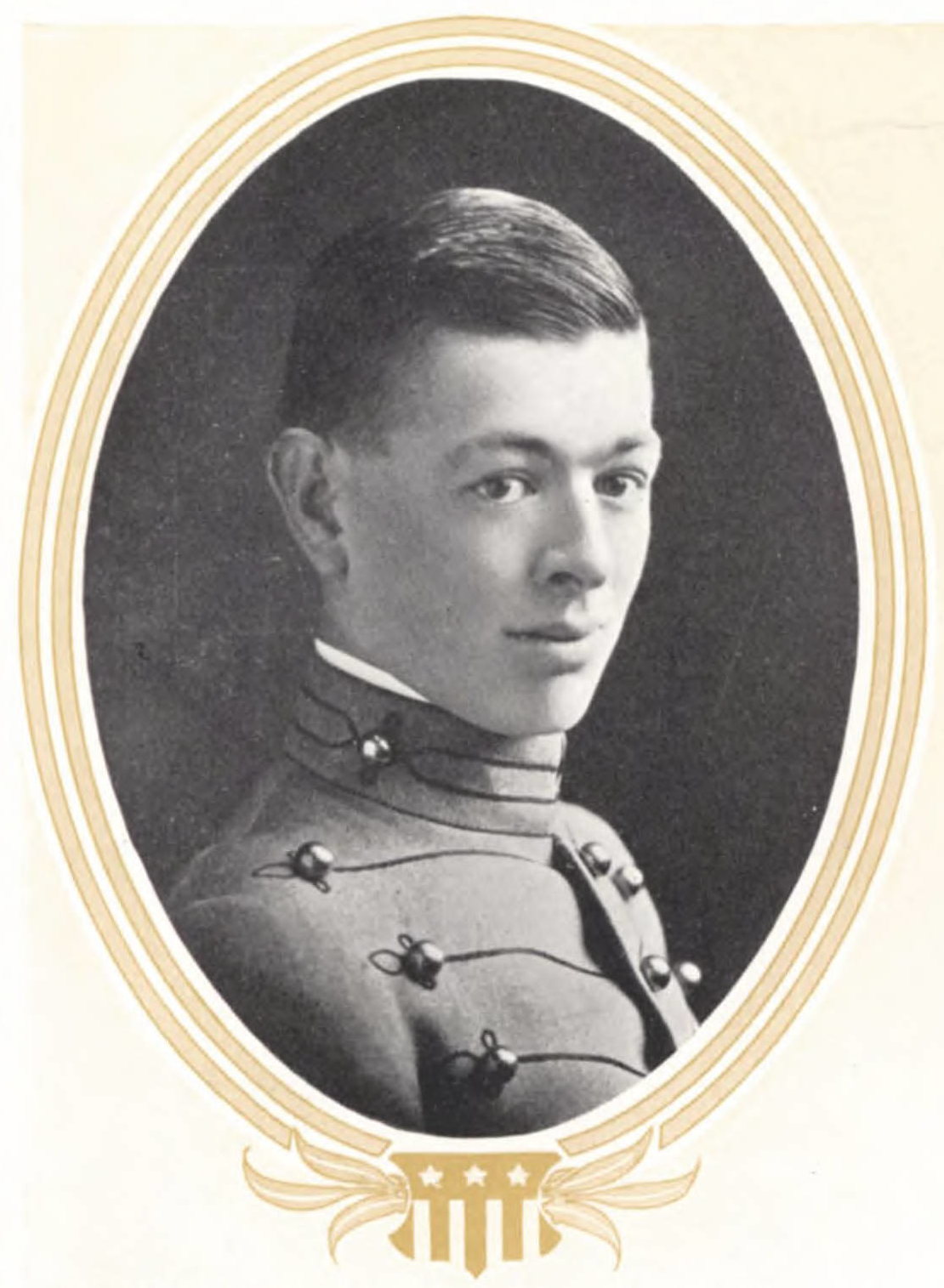
At West Point in 1915

Stafford LeRoy Irwin was born March 23, 1893, at Fort Monroe, Virginia, the son of Major General George LeRoy Irwin and his wife Marla Elizabeth. He attended the United States Military Academy (USMA) at West Point, New York in 1911, at the age of 18. He graduated 40th in a class of 164 in June 1915 as a part of the West Point class of 1915, also known as "the class the stars fell on". Many of Irwin's classmates became general officers during World War II, including Dwight D. Eisenhower, Omar Bradley, Henry Aurand, John W. Leonard, James Van Fleet, Joseph May Swing, Charles W. Ryder, Paul J. Mueller, Roscoe B. Woodruff, Vernon Prichard, Leland Hobbs, and numerous others.

He was subsequently commissioned as a second lieutenant in the Cavalry Branch of the United States Army on the same date of his graduation. Irwin subsequently served with the cavalry during the Pancho Villa Expedition, which was commanded by Brigadier General John J. Pershing, as a member of the 11th Cavalry Regiment in 1916 and the following year.

During World War I he served initially with the 80th Field Artillery Regiment, and then was a student at the U.S. Army Field Artillery School at Fort Sill, Oklahoma, where he was received promotion to the temporary rank of major but saw no service overseas as the war came to an end on November 11, 1918.

== Between the wars ==
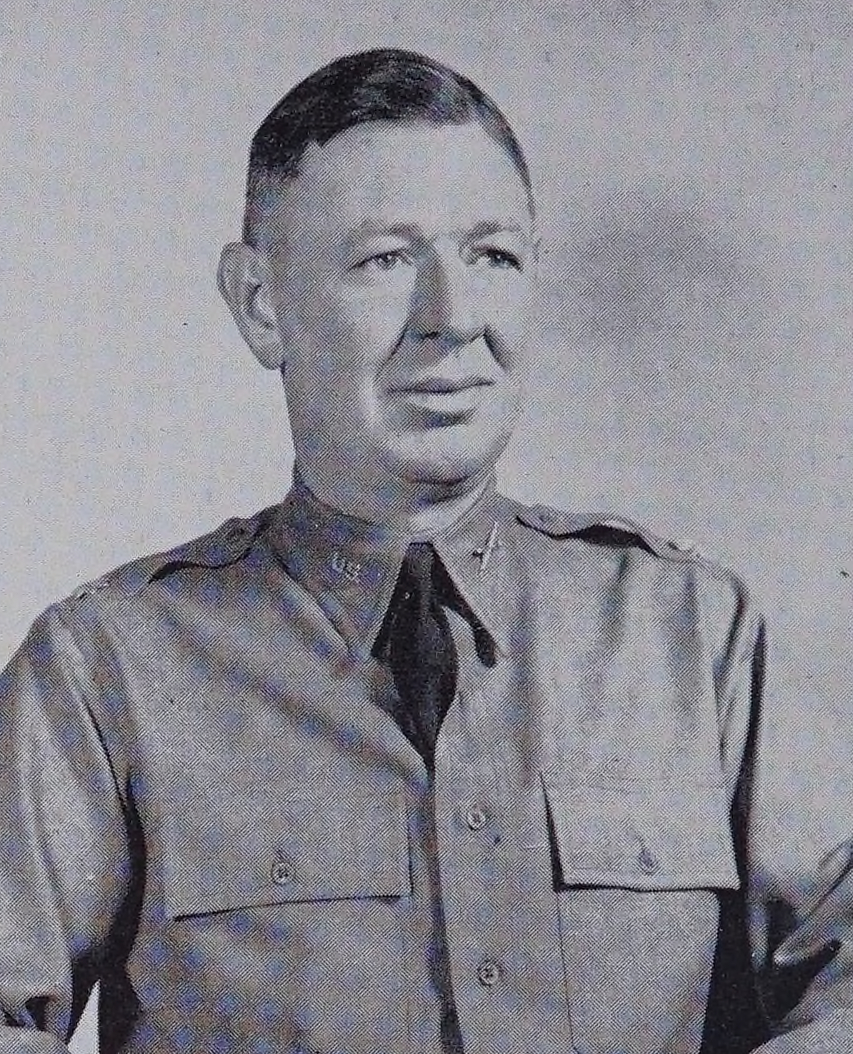
Irwin as a member of the Fort Bragg Field Artillery Board c. 1941

During the interwar period Irwin, realizing the cavalry was becoming obsolete (which trench warfare and World War I had shown), transferred to the Field Artillery Branch. From 1919 to 1920 he was Professor of Military Science and Tactics at Yale University and from 1920 to 1924 was an instructor for the Oklahoma Army National Guard. Between 1929 and 1933 he was an instructor for the U.S. Army Field Artillery School and, from 1933 to 1936 served with the Organized Reserves. He attended the U.S. Army Field Artillery School in 1926, the U.S. Army Command and General Staff School from 1926 to 1927, and the U.S. Army War College in 1937.

== World War II ==
Stafford Irwin was the commander of artillery for the 9th Infantry Division in North Africa. He was noted for performing well during the Battle of Kasserine Pass in Tunisia, particularly during the engagement with Field Marshall Erwin Rommel at Thala. Following the North African campaign he was given command of the 5th Infantry Division during Patton's drive across Europe.

General Irwin finished the war as commander of XII Corps after Manton S. Eddy, the previous corps commander, was sent home due to ill health, and served in that position until September 1945.

== Postwar and retirement ==
Coat of Arms of Bernard Stafford LeRoy Irwin

After the war, Irwin returned to the United States and became commander of V Corps in 1946 and director of the Military Intelligence Division in 1948. He was promoted to lieutenant general on October 15, 1950. He finished his military career as the commander of U.S. Army forces in Austria from 1950 to 1952 when he retired due to medical problems on May 31, 1952.

Lt. Gen. Irwin died in 1955 of a coronary occlusion in Asheville, North Carolina, and was buried at Arlington National Cemetery.

== Personal life ==
Irwin married in 1921 to Helen (Hall) Irwin and together they had one son, Francis LeRoy. After Helen died in 1937, Irwin remarried in 1941 to Clare (Moran) Irwin. His second marriage also produced a son.

== Decorations ==
Lieutenant General Irwin's ribbon bar:

1st Row	Army Distinguished Service Medal		Silver Star	Legion of Merit with Oak Leaf Cluster
2nd Row	Bronze Star Medal with Oak Leaf Cluster	Army Commendation Medal	Mexican Service Medal	World War I Victory Medal
3rd Row	American Defense Service Medal	American Campaign Medal	European African Middle Eastern Campaign Medal with eight service stars	World War II Victory Medal
4th Row	Army of Occupation Medal	National Defense Service Medal	Commander of the Order of the British Empire	Officer of the Legion of Honour (France)
5th Row	French Croix de Guerre 1939–1945 with Palm	Military Order of the White Lion (Czechoslovakia)	Czechoslovak War Cross 1939-1945	Luxembourg War Cross
5th Row	Knight of the Order of the Oak Crown (Luxembourg)	Order of the Patriotic War First Class (USSR)	Order of the Patriotic War First Class (USSR)	Bravery Medal (USSR)

Military offices
Preceded by Cortland T. Parker	Commanding General 5th Infantry Division; 1943–1945	Succeeded by Albert E. Brown
Preceded by Manton S. Eddy	Commanding General XII Corps; April–September 1945	Succeeded by Organization deactivated
Preceded by Orlando Ward	Commanding General V Corps; 1946–1948	Succeeded by John R. Hodge
