= XII Corps (United States) =

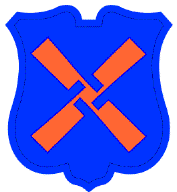
- Shoulder sleeve insignia of XII Corps
- Active: 29 July 1921–1 October 1933; 1 October 1933–15 December 1945; 25 March 1948–1 April 1968
- Country: United States of America
- Branch: United States Army
- Role: Headquarters
- Size: Corps
- Part of: Third United States Army
- Engagements: World War II; Northern France; Rhineland; Ardennes-Alsace; Central Europe

Commanders
- Notable commanders: Manton S. Eddy; Stafford LeRoy Irwin

Insignia
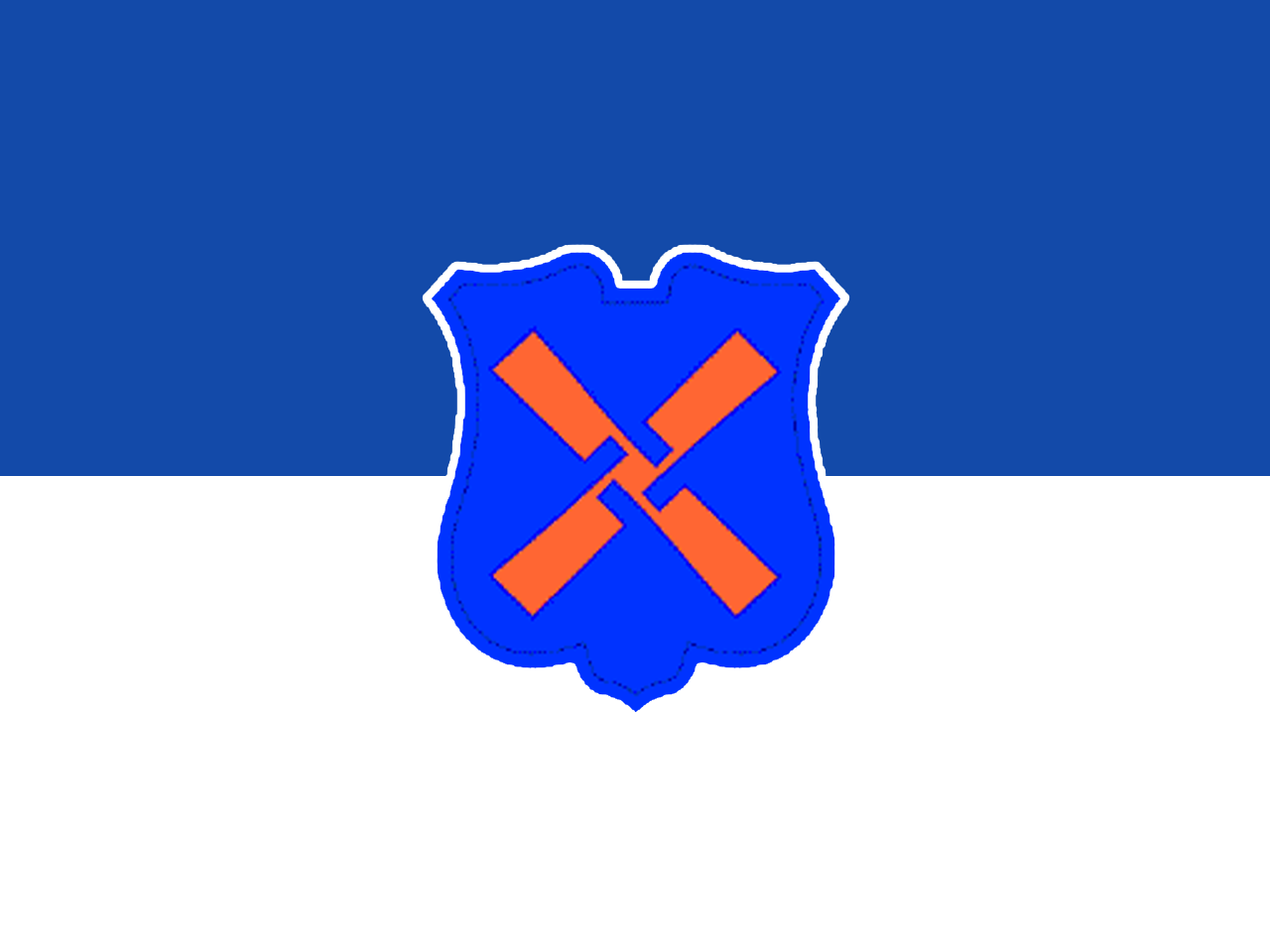
- XII Corps Flag

Route of march of U.S. XII Corps.

The XII Corps fought from northern France to Austria in World War II. Constituted in the Organized Reserves in 1933, it was activated on 29 August 1942 at Columbia, South Carolina. XII Corps became operational in France as part of Lieutenant General George S. Patton's Third Army on 1 August 1944. A total of 15 divisions would be a part of XII Corps throughout the war.

== Interwar period ==
=== XII Corps (I) ===
The XII Corps was authorized by the National Defense Act of 1920 and was to be composed of units of the Organized Reserve located primarily in the Second Corps Area. The corps headquarters and headquarters company was created on 29 July 1921 in the Regular Army, allotted to the Second Corps Area, and assigned to the Fourth Army. Both units were organized on 10 October 1921 with Organized Reserve units in Manhattan, New York. The corps headquarters was activated on 23 February 1922 at 39 Whitehall Street in Manhattan with Regular Army personnel.

The corps headquarters was responsible for providing and planning administration, organization, supply, and training for army, corps, and other non-divisional Reserve units, less field and coast artillery, in the Second Corps Area. The headquarters was relieved from active duty on 10 October 1925 and all Regular Army personnel were reassigned to the Headquarters, Non-Divisional Group, Second Corps Area, which assumed the responsibilities previously held by the XII Corps. Both the headquarters and the headquarters company remained as "Regular Army Inactive" units, as assignment units for Reserve personnel for wartime mobilization. The headquarters was withdrawn from the Regular Army on 1 October 1933 and demobilized.

=== XII Corps (II) ===
The second iteration of the XII Corps was constituted in the Organized Reserve on 1 October 1933, allotted to the Second Corps Area, and assigned to the First Army. The headquarters was initiated on 24 January 1934 at Manhattan. In the event of mobilization, it was to be fully activated with Regular Army officers from the Second Corps Area and with Reserve personnel already assigned to the corps headquarters and headquarters company in peacetime. The designated mobilization station was Camp Dix, New Jersey, where the corps headquarters would assume command and control of the subordinate corps troops mobilizing throughout the Second Corps Area. It was redesignated on 1 January 1941 as Headquarters, XII Army Corps. The XII Army Corps was not ordered to active duty prior to World War II, and was located in Manhattan as of 7 December 1941 in a reserve status. The headquarters, XII Army Corps was redesignated on 19 August 1942 as Headquarters, XII Corps, and ordered into active military service on 29 August 1942 at Columbia, South Carolina.

== Training ==
Major General William H. Simpson took command of XII Corps 2 September 1942 and were ordered to prepare for the Tennessee Maneuvers. At this time the following units were attached to XII Corps: 8th Motorized Infantry Division, 30th, 77th and the 78th Infantry Divisions. None of these would be with the Corps when it entered combat. Throughout its training, the XII Corps would be assigned to Second Army. The corps, like others at the time, struggled with lack of supplies and facilities as well as the task of turning civilians into soldiers. The corps would move to its first headquarters at Fort Jackson in June 1943. In October 1943, General Simpson was promoted to Lieutenant General and became the commander of Third Army and in November Major General Gilbert R. Cook took command. Gen. Cook was known to simplify things under his command, such as the mission - "to kill Germans." He also instilled his three-deep command philosophy - that every soldier should have three soldiers under him that can do his job should he be killed. During this time the corps was also supplying other units with cadre and losing experience. The corps would participate in the January to February Tennessee maneuvers in 1944 and then head to Camp Forrest for embarkation at the port of New York. The Queen Mary and the Duchess of Bedford took the XII Corps to England. The corps would move into Camp Bewdley in Worcestershire, England. The Corps would be assigned to Lt. General George Patton's Third Army at this time with orders to prepare for movement to France.

== World War II ==
Assembling south of Le Mans on 13 August 1944, XII Corps began driving eastward and liberated the cities of Orléans and Châteaudun within five days. Moving rapidly against disorganized German resistance, the corps rapidly took Sens, Montargis, Troyes, Châlons-sur-Marne, and Vitry-le-François. On 18 August 1944 General Cook was struck by a circulatory illness leaving him unable to walk. Major General Manton S. Eddy would take command. By 31 August 1944, XII Corps had seized a bridgehead over the Meuse River at Commercy in Lorraine.

At the beginning of September 1944, serious gasoline shortages forced an abrupt halt to General Patton's pursuit across northern France. Resuming its advance on 4 September, but facing shortages of gasoline and ammunition because of the allied logistical crisis, XII Corps now confronted a vastly changed tactical situation. A combination of German reinforcements and regained cohesion in the German forces (5th Panzer Army) confronting the U.S. Third Army resulted in dramatically increased German resistance in the region of Metz and Nancy in the Moselle River valley. From the German point of view, Lorraine (German: Lothringen) was seen as part of Germany and would be defended with bitter determination.

XII Corps assaulted across the Moselle River at Dieulouard on 13 September 1944, and heavy fighting ensued for three days as the Germans attempted to collapse the bridgehead. During 15–16 September, the corps liberated Nancy and Lunéville. The advance of XII Corps was met by an armored counterattack of the 5th Panzer Army. At Arracourt during 19–20 September 1944, the corps' U.S. 4th Armored Division destroyed two German Panzer brigades. Desperate fighting continued until 1 October 1944 for the area around Arracourt, Moyenvic, and Grémecey's forest. Resuming its advance, the corps pushed to the river Seille by 9 October 1944.

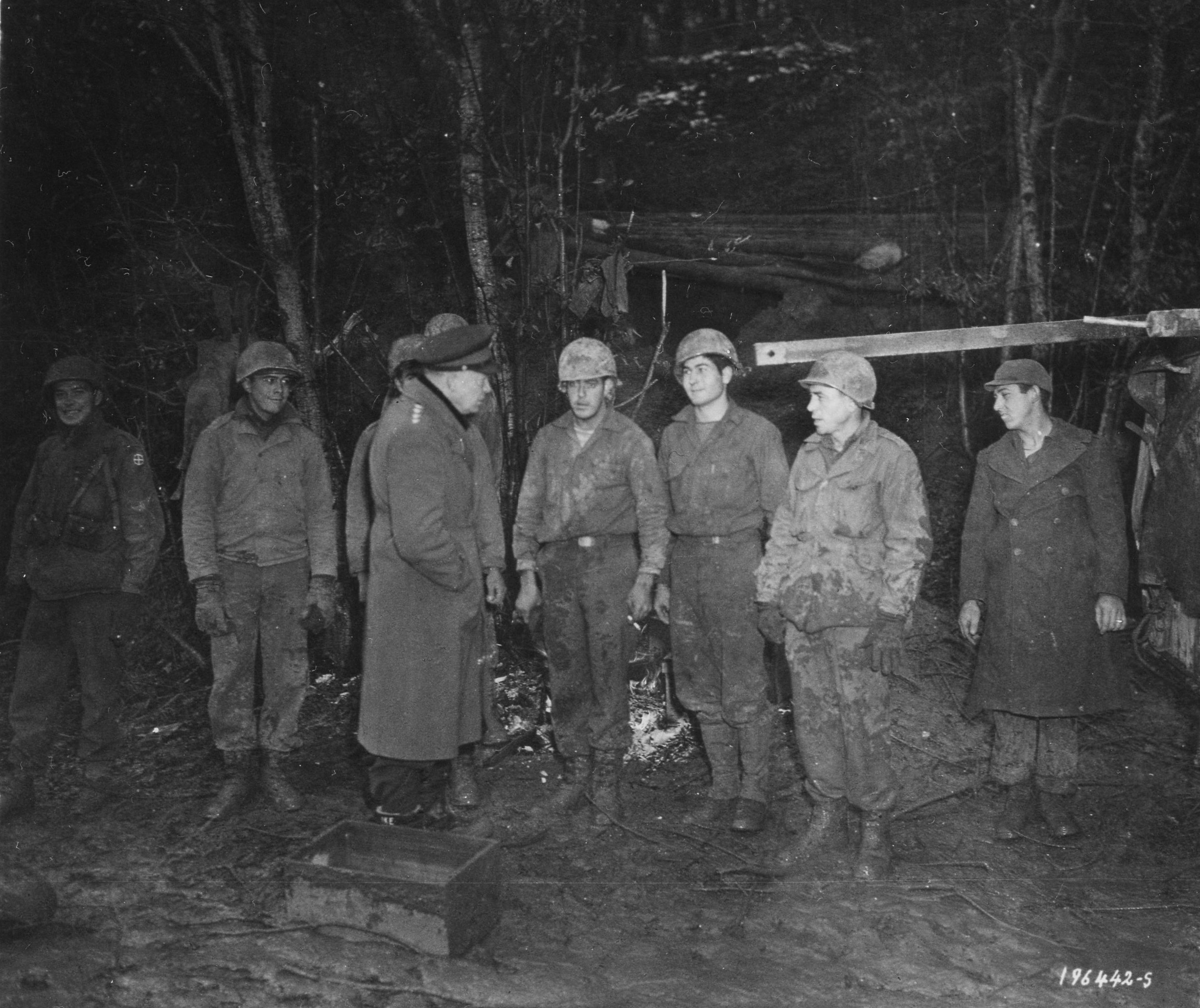
General Eisenhower talks to GIs on recent tour of XII Corps units at the Château-Salins front, November 15, 1944.

After resting and reorganizing for a month, XII Corps opened an offensive to reach the Saar River on 8 November 1944. Château-Salins was taken on 9 November, and the corps battled through firm German resistance to liberate Faulquemont on 20 November 1944. On 24 November, the corps crossed the Saar River and then liberated Saint-Avold on 27 November 1944. From 1 to 11 December 1944, XII Corps fought for, and liberated the towns of Sarre-Union and Sarreguemines. On 12 December, the corps entered Germany and began operations against the Siegfried Line fortifications.

Germany's surprise offensive into the Ardennes on 16 December 1944, resulted in the U.S. Third Army being moved northward to attack the southern flank of the German army in Belgium and Luxembourg. Turning over its part of the front to the U.S. XV Corps, XII Corps moved to the area of Luxembourg city on 21 December 1944. Subsequently, the corps cleared the west bank of the Moselle River in Luxembourg until 11 January 1945. During 18–23 January, XII Corps assaulted across the Sauer River and cleared the twin confluences of the Our River and the Sauer, and then that of the Sauer and Moselle Rivers.

On 7 February 1945, the corps assaulted across the Our and Sauer Rivers between Vianden and Echternach, repelling German counter-attacks against the bridgeheads and gradually clearing Siegfried Line bunkers in the area until 15 February. On 18 February 1945, XII Corps drove on the Prüm River, which it assaulted across on the night of 24–25 February. Bitburg fell to XII Corps on 28 February 1945. The corps assaulted across the Kyll River on the night of 2–3 March 1945, and reached the Rhine River in the area of Andernach on 7 March. From 7–11 March 1945, the corps mopped up along the west bank of the Rhine and Moselle Rivers.

Assaulting across the Moselle River at Treis on 14 March 1945, the corps seized Bad Kreuznach on 18 March and Worms on 21 March. On 22 March 1945, XII Corps assaulted across the Rhine River at Oppenheim without involved preparation and caught the Germans in the area off-guard. From 21 to 27 March, the corps battled for, and seized Mainz. On 25 March, Darmstadt fell to XII Corps. Against the wishes of MG Eddy, General Patton ordered the XII Corps to dispatch a raiding force (Task Force Baum) to liberate the Hammelburg prisoner of war camp on 25 March. The camp was rumored to contain Patton's son in law Lieutenant Colonel John Waters (and it was the case that he was held there). TF Baum was trapped and destroyed near Hammelburg on 27 March 1945. On 26 March 1945, the corps assaulted across the Main River into Frankfurt am Main, and fought for three days to capture the city in the face of German resistance characterized by the use of assault guns and a heavy concentration of Flak artillery in the dense urban environment. Moving rapidly northeast, the corps bypassed German troop concentrations and conquered Hanau (28 March), Bad Hersfeld (31 March), and Fulda (2 April). The corps paused between Gotha and Suhl on 3 April 1945. On 4 April 1945 XII Corps troops discovered a Nazi stash of art treasures and gold in a salt mine at Merkers, and then took Meiningen the following day.

In a questionable allocation of allied military strength, Generals Dwight D. Eisenhower (supreme allied commander) and Omar Bradley (commander of U.S. 12th Army Group) paused 12th Army Group's (to which the U.S. Third Army belonged) advance at the Elbe River and then committed the U.S. Third Army, the U.S. Seventh Army and the French First Army to overrun what they believed was an "Alpine Redoubt" in the south of Germany. The so-called redoubt proved to be a myth and the commitment of eight U.S. and French army corps against it was a curious use of allied military resources while other allied armies in the north paused 60 miles from the true heart of German resistance, Berlin.

== Final operations ==
This decision committed XII Corps to an advance to the southeast. Taking Coburg on 11 April 1945, the corps then took Bayreuth in a three-day battle ending on 16 April. The same day 16 April 1945, Gen. Eddy was diagnosed with life-threatening high blood pressure and was relieved by Patton. Major General Stafford LeRoy Irwin would replace Eddy until the war's end. Moving rapidly, XII Corps liberated the Flossenburg concentration camp on 23 April and reached the Danube River on 25 April 1945. Operating simultaneously in Germany and Czechoslovakia, the corps crossed into Austria and assaulted across the Danube River southwest of Regensburg on 26 April 1945. The corps seized Linz on 4–5 May 1945, and began clearing passes in Czechoslovakia for a drive on Prague. VE Day brought a close to combat operations for the XII Corps, as the corps linked up with Red Army troops near Amstetten.

== Campaign credits and inactivation ==
XII Corps is credited with service in the Northern France, Rhineland, Ardennes-Alsace, and Central Europe campaigns. Headquarters, XII Corps, was inactivated on 15 December 1945 in Germany. It was redesignated on 15 October 1958 as Headquarters, XII United States Army Corps; concurrently withdrawn from the Army Reserve and allotted to the Regular Army. Activated 1 November 1958 at Atlanta, Georgia. Inactivated 1 April 1968 at Atlanta, Georgia.

== Commanders ==
Deputy Commander

- Brig. Gen. William Weigel (23 February 1922–20 March 1924)

Commander

- Major General William H. Simpson (September, 1942 - October, 1943)
- Major General Gilbert R. Cook (1 November 1943 - 18 August 1944)
- Major General Manton S. Eddy (19 August 1944 - 19 April 1945)
- Major General Stafford LeRoy Irwin (20 April 1945 - September, 1945)
