= Manton S. Eddy =

United States Army general (1892–1962)

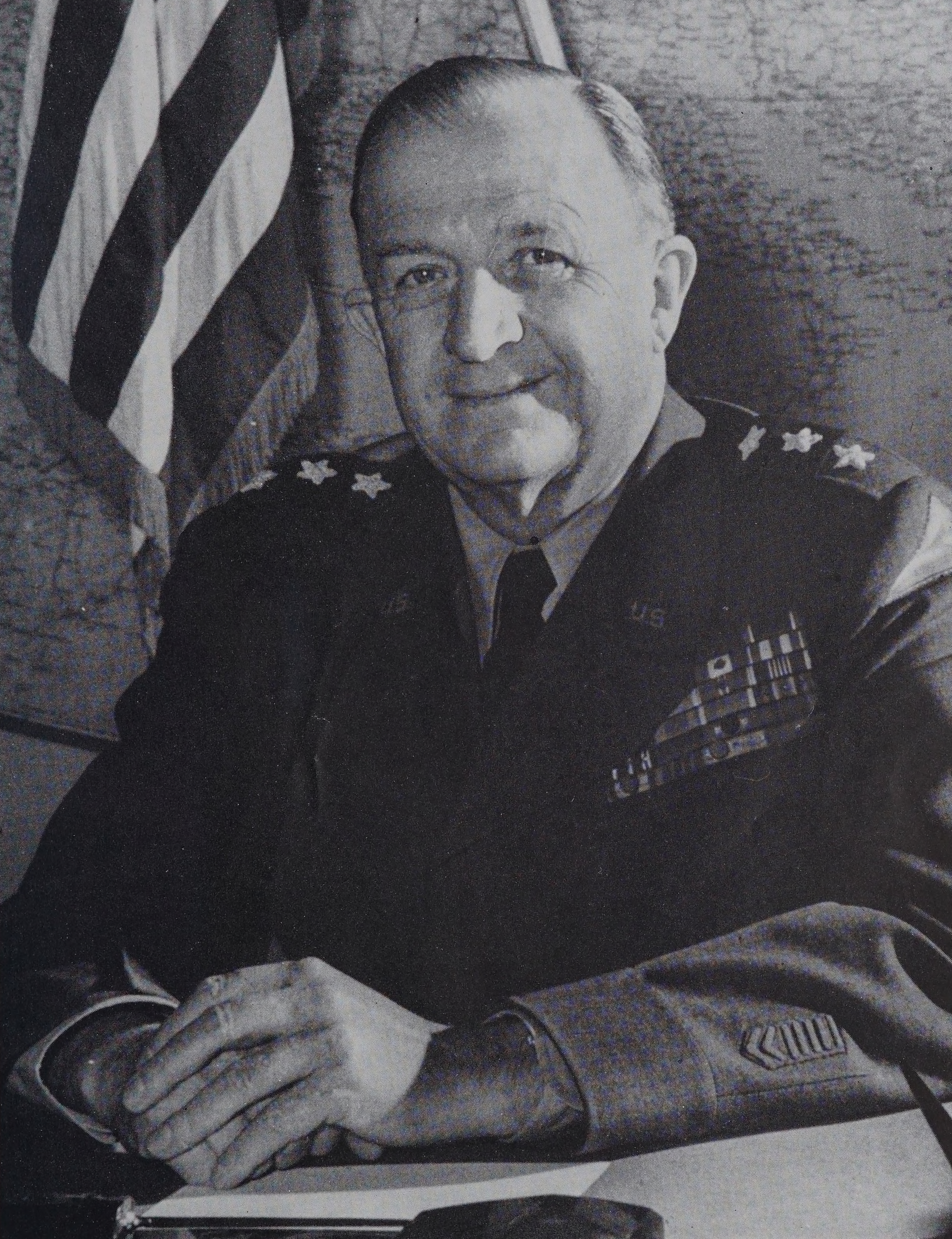
- Eddy as a Lieutenant General, 1952
- Born: May 16, 1892; Chicago, Illinois, United States
- Died: April 10, 1962 (aged 69); Fort Benning, Georgia, United States
- Military career
- Allegiance: United States
- Branch: United States Army
- Service years: 1916–1953
- Rank: Lieutenant General
- Service number: 0-4655
- Units: Infantry Branch
- Commands: United States Army Europe; Seventh Army; United States Army Command and General Staff College; XII Corps; 9th Infantry Division; 114th Infantry Regiment; 11th Machine Gun Battalion
- Conflicts: World War I World War II; Korean War
- Awards: Distinguished Service Cross; Army Distinguished Service Medal (2); Silver Star; Legion of Merit (2); Bronze Star (2)

Lieutenant General Manton Sprague Eddy (May 16, 1892 – April 10, 1962) was a senior United States Army officer who served in both World War I and World War II. During the latter conflict he served with distinction, commanding the 9th Infantry Division and later the XII Corps in the campaign in Western Europe, playing a large part in the Battle of the Bulge in late December 1944, leading the corps until April 20, 1945, when health problems forced him to turn over command.

== Early life and military career ==
Eddy graduated from Shattuck Military School in Faribault, Minnesota, in 1913. He enlisted in the Infantry Branch of the United States Army in 1916 and was commissioned as a second lieutenant of infantry in early 1918, a few months after the American entry into World War I the previous April. With the rank of captain, he was a company commander in the 11th Machine Gun Battalion, part of the 4th Division of the American Expeditionary Forces (AEF). He was sent to the Western Front with his division in May 1918 but was wounded in the leg in August, when the tide of the war had turned against the Germans. He recovered soon after and commanded a machine gun battalion until the end of the war on November 11, 1918.

== Between the wars ==
Promoted to the wartime temporary rank of major, Eddy served in Allied-occupied Germany until 1919 when he returned to the United States. Returning to the rank of captain in the Regular Army in 1920, Eddy married Mamie Peabody Buttolph in 1921. During the period between the wars, he was a member of the Infantry Board and was a student, later an instructor, at both the United States Army Infantry School and the United States Army Command and General Staff School at Fort Leavenworth, Kansas. He also served as Professor of Military Science and Tactics at Riverdale Military Academy. While at the Infantry School, he met George C. Marshall, the future Army Chief of Staff, who was impressed with Eddy.

By 1940, Eddy was an intelligence officer with III Corps. In 1941 Eddy assumed command of the 114th Infantry Regiment, part of the 44th Infantry Division, a National Guard formation.

== World War II ==
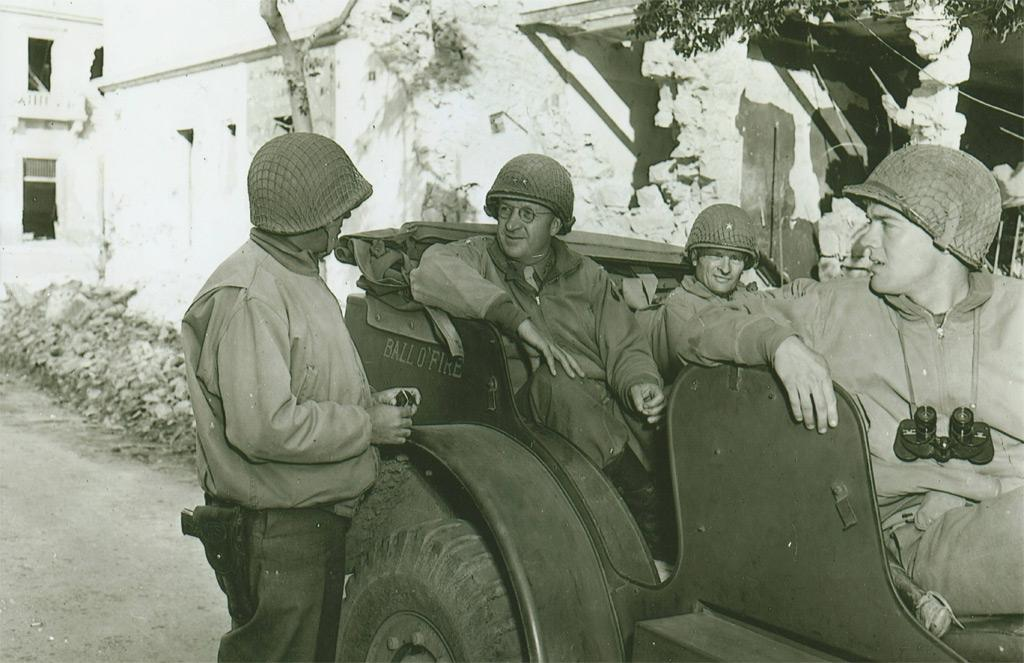
Major General Manton S. Eddy (left), commander of the 9th Infantry Division, and his assistant division commander (ADC), Brigadier General Donald A. Stroh, in a Dodge Command Reconnaissance Car, in Bizerte, Tunisia on May 9, 1943.

In March 1942, three months after the Japanese attack on Pearl Harbor and the subsequent American entry into World War II, Eddy was promoted to the one-star general officer rank of brigadier general on March 24, 1942, and became the assistant division commander (ADC) of the 9th Infantry Division. On August 8, he was promoted to the two-star rank of major general and succeeded Major General Rene Edward De Russy Hoyle as Commanding General of the 9th Infantry Division, a Regular Army formation, while Brigadier General Donald A. Stroh succeeded Eddy as the 9th's ADC.

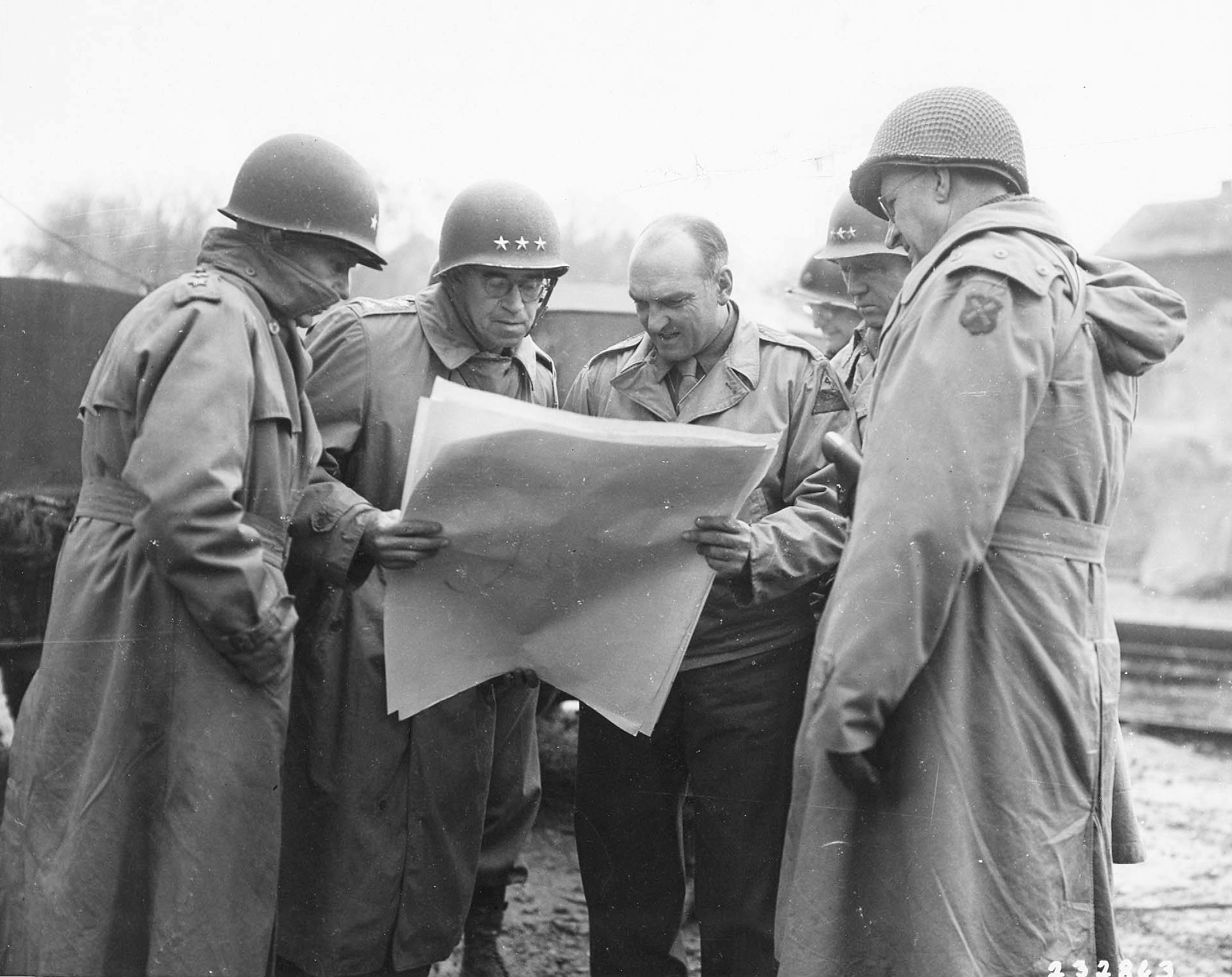
Lieutenant General Omar Bradley, Lieutenant General George S. Patton, and Major General Manton S. Eddy being shown a map by Major General John S. Wood during a tour near Metz, France, November 13, 1944.

After training in the United States for several months Eddy led the division overseas, landing in French North Africa on November 8, 1942, as part of Operation Torch. The 9th Division fought in the subsequent Allied campaign in North Africa, and played a large role in the Battle of Kasserine Pass in February 1943. The campaign came to an end in May 1943, with the surrender of almost 250,000 Axis soldiers.

Eddy later led the 9th Division in Operation Husky, codename for the Allied invasion of Sicily, in August 1943. In November the 9th Division was sent to England in preparation for the Allied invasion of Northern France, scheduled for the spring of 1944.

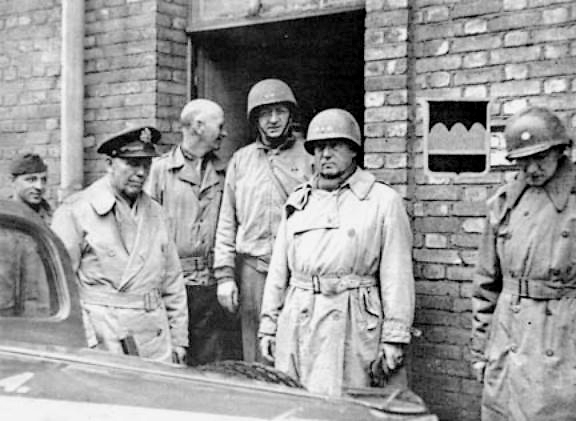
Shown from left to right are: an unidentified driver, General George C. Marshall, Major General Horace L. McBride, Major General Manton S. Eddy, Lieutenant General George S. Patton, and an unidentified aide.

Eddy led the 9th Division in the early stages of Operation Overlord, codename for the Battle of Normandy, landing on Utah Beach four days after the D-Day landings of June 6, 1944. For his role in the capture of the French port of Cherbourg, which much impressed his superiors, Eddy was awarded the Distinguished Service Cross. In the opinion of General Dwight D. Eisenhower, Eddy had outperformed all the other American divisional commanders in Normandy, and he had slated Eddy to take over the next available corps.

In August he became Commanding General of XII Corps, which was often the spearhead of Lieutenant General George S. Patton's Third Army. Eddy led XII Corps in the Allied advance from Paris to the Rhine and in the subsequent fighting on the Western Front. During the Battle of the Bulge, Eddy's XII Corps successfully held the southern shoulder of the German salient. In April 1945, after taking part in the Western Allied invasion of Germany, shortly before the end of World War II in Europe, Eddy returned to the United States due to a severe illness (extreme hypertension, from which he eventually recovered) and was replaced in command of XII Corps by Major General Stafford LeRoy Irwin.

== Postwar ==
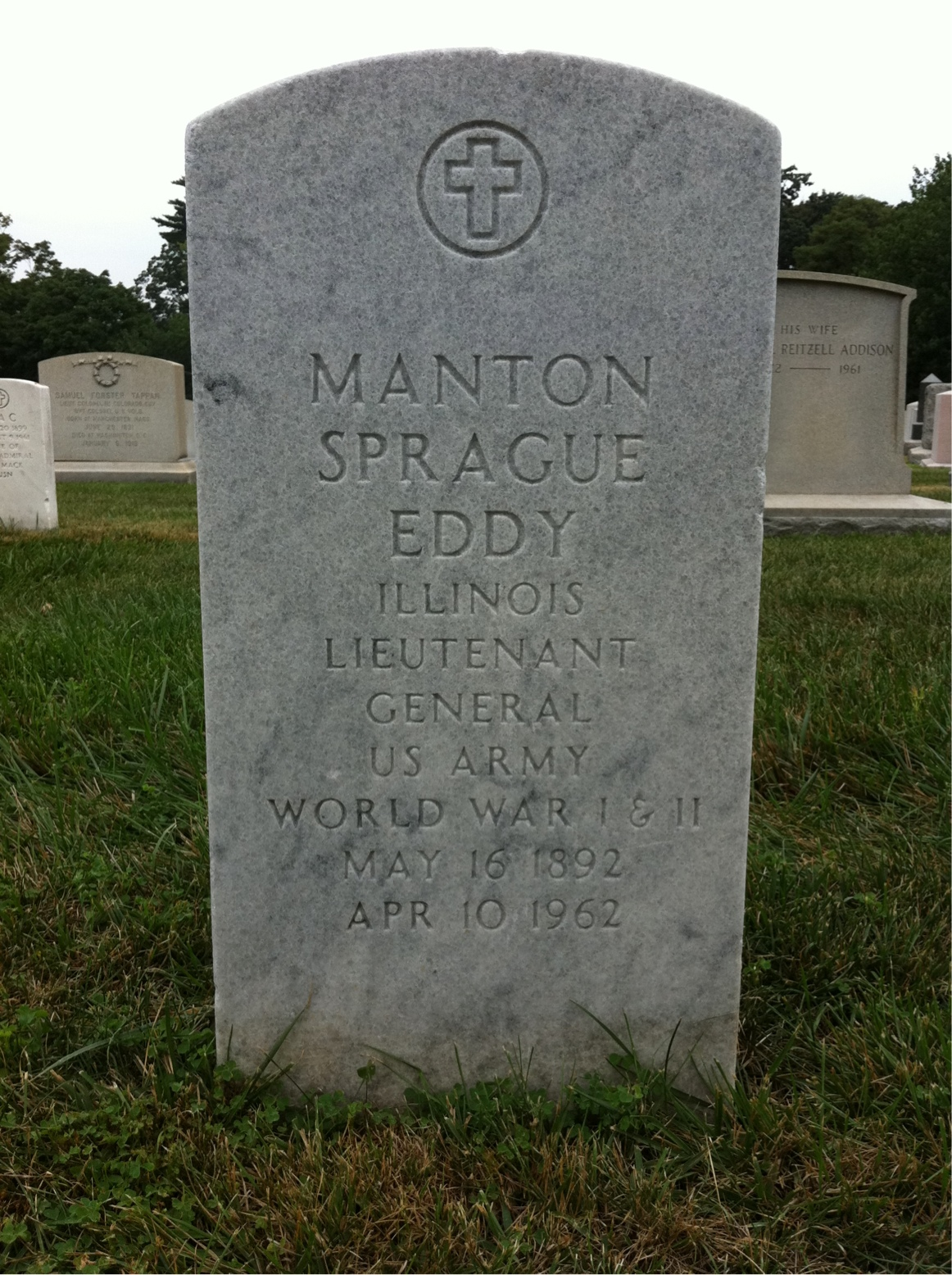
The grave of Lieutenant General Manton S. Eddy at Arlington National Cemetery.

In the postwar period, Eddy served again at Fort Leavenworth, Kansas, this time as Commandant of the United States Army Command and General Staff College, from January 1948 to July 1950. He was president of a review board that made a thorough examination of officer education and established the progressive branch, staff, and senior service levels of officer schooling. As commander of the Seventh Army, he presided over its transformation from an army of occupation to one of deterrence. Eddy retired from the army with the rank of lieutenant general.

Eddy died in Columbus, Georgia on April 10, 1962, at the age of 69. Eddy is buried at Arlington National Cemetery, Virginia.

== Awards and decorations ==
- Distinguished Service Cross
- Army Distinguished Service Medal (2)
- Silver Star
- Legion of Merit (2)
- Bronze Star (2)
- Air Medal
- Purple Heart
- Honorary Companion of the Order of the Bath (United Kingdom)
- Legion of Honour (France)
- Croix de Guerre (France)
- Order of the Patriotic War First Class (Union of Soviet Socialist Republics)
- Bravery Medal (Union of Soviet Socialist Republics)
- Commander of the Order of Leopold (Belgium)

== Bibliography ==
- Phillips, Henri Gerard (2000). The Making of a Professional: Manton S. Eddy, USA. Bloomsbury Publishing. ISBN 978-0313311833.
- "Manton Sprague Eddy" in Dictionary of American Biography, Supplement 7: 19611965. American Council of Learned Societies, 1981
- Taaffe, Stephen R. (2013). Marshall and His Generals: U.S. Army Commanders in World War II. Lawrence, Kansas: University Press of Kansas. ISBN 978-0-7006-1942-9. OCLC 840162019.
- Collins, James Lawton; Chandler, David G. (1994). The D-Day Encyclopedia. Simon & Schuster. ISBN 0132036215.

Military offices
Preceded by Rene Edward De Russy Hoyle	Commanding General 9th Infantry Division; 1943–1944	Succeeded by Louis A. Craig
Preceded by Gilbert R. Cook	Commanding General XII Corps; 1944–1945	Succeeded by Stafford LeRoy Irwin
Preceded by Leonard T. Gerow	Commandant of the United States Army Command and General Staff College; 1948–1950	Succeeded by Harlan N. Hartness
Preceded by Oscar Griswold	Commanding General Seventh Army; 1950–1952	Succeeded by Charles L. Bolte
Preceded by Thomas T. Handy	Commanding General United States Army Europe; 1952–1953	Succeeded by Charles L. Bolte
