= George LeRoy Irwin =

United States Army general (1868–1931)

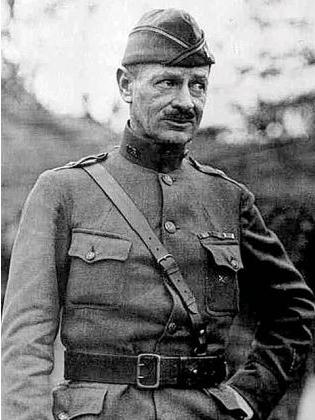
- Born: April 26, 1868; Fort Wayne (Detroit), Detroit, Michigan
- Died: February 19, 1931 (aged 62); Trinidad
- Relatives: BG Bernard J. D. Irwin (Father); LTG General Stafford L. Irwin (Son)
- Military career
- Allegiance: United States of America
- Branch: United States Army
- Service years: 1889–1931
- Rank: Major General
- Commands: 57th Field Artillery Brigade
- Conflicts: Spanish–American War; Philippine–American War; Cuban Pacification; World War I
- Awards: Distinguished Service Medal; Legion of Honor

George LeRoy Irwin (April 26, 1868 – February 19, 1931) was a major general of the United States Army. Fort Irwin National Training Center is named in his honor.

== Early life ==
Irwin was born on April 26, 1868, at Fort Wayne (Detroit) in Detroit, Michigan. His parents were colonel (later Army Brigadier General) Bernard J. D. Irwin, a surgeon in the Army Medical Corps who received the Medal of Honor in the Apache Wars, and his wife Antoinette Elizabeth Stahl Irwin.

== Career ==
Irwin graduated from the United States Military Academy in 1889, 25th in a class of 49. He served in the Spanish–American War, Philippine–American War, Cuban Pacification and World War I. Irwin graduated from the United States Army War College in 1910.

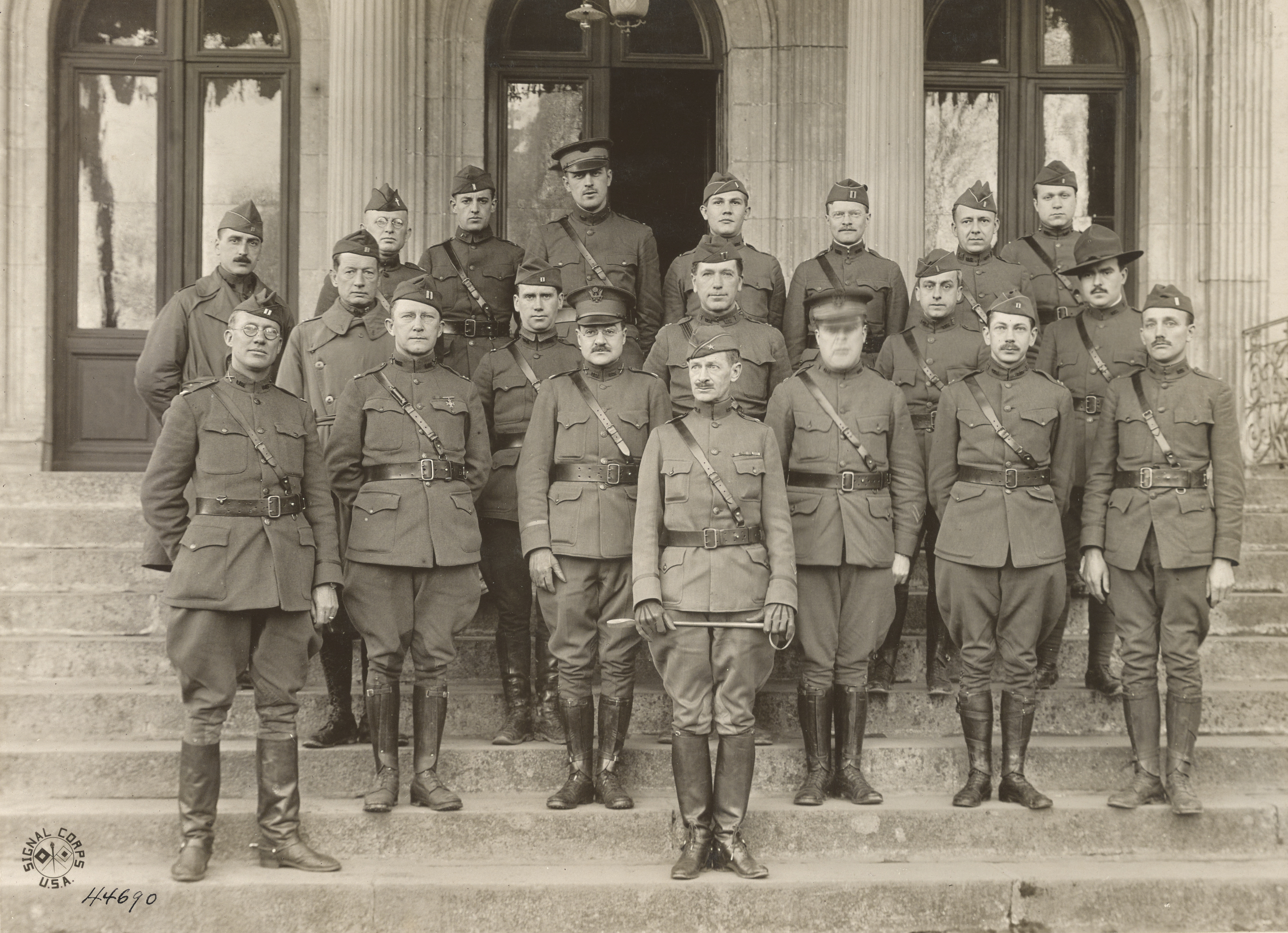
Brigadier General Irwin and staff at the Artillery School at Saumur, Maine-et-Loire, France, December 17, 1918.

During World War I, Irwin, then a brigadier general, commanded the 57th Field Artillery Brigade of the 32nd Infantry Division under the command of Major General William G. Haan. Irwin distinguished himself during the Second Battle of the Marne, Oise-Aisne Offensive and Meuse–Argonne offensive and received the Army Distinguished Service Medal.

After the war, Irwin reverted to his permanent rank of colonel in 1919. He was promoted to brigadier general again in 1923 and then to major general in 1928.

== Personal life and family ==
Irwin married Maria Elizabeth Barker on April 30, 1892. Irwin's son, Stafford LeRoy Irwin, retired as a lieutenant general.

== Death and legacy ==
Irwin died on February 19, 1931, on Trinidad. The general and his wife were buried at the West Point Cemetery next to his parents.

In 1942, the Mojave Anti-Aircraft Range (today: Fort Irwin National Training Center) was named in his honor.

== Decorations ==
Army Distinguished Service Medal
Spanish War Service Medal
Philippine Campaign Medal
Army of Cuban Pacification Medal
World War I Victory Medal with 3 Battle Clasps
Officer of the Legion of Honor

== Citation ==
Coat of Arms of George LeRoy Irwin

The citation for Irwin's Army Distinguished Service Medal reads:

General Orders: War Department, General Orders No. 19 (1920)
Action Date: World War I
Name: George LeRoy Irwin
Service: Army
Rank: Brigadier General
Company: Commanding General
Regiment: 57th Field Artillery Brigade
Division: 32d Division, American Expeditionary Forces
Citation: The President of the United States of America, authorized by Act of Congress, July 9, 1918, takes pleasure in presenting the Army Distinguished Service Medal to Brigadier General George LeRoy Irwin, United States Army, for exceptionally meritorious and distinguished services to the Government of the United States, in a duty of great responsibility during World War I. General Irwin Commanded with ability the 57th Field Artillery Brigade, 32d Division, during the Marne-Aisne, Oise-Aisne, and Meuse-Argonne offensives. At all times he displayed keen judgment, high military attainments, and loyal devotion to duty. The success of the Division whose advance he supported was due in a large measure to his eminent technical skill and ability as an artillerist.
