= 309th Regiment =

309th Regiment may refer to:

- 309th Armored Cavalry Regiment, United States
- 309th Cavalry Regiment, United States
- 309th (Westmorland and Cumberland) Coast Regiment, Royal Artillery

== See also ==
- 309th (disambiguation)
