= 309 (disambiguation) =

309 may refer to:

- 309 (year)
- 309 (number)
- Peugeot 309
- NGC 309
- UFC 309

== See also ==
- 309th (disambiguation)
