= 379th Infantry Regiment =

Unit of the US Army

379th Infantry Regiment 379th Regiment (Training Support)
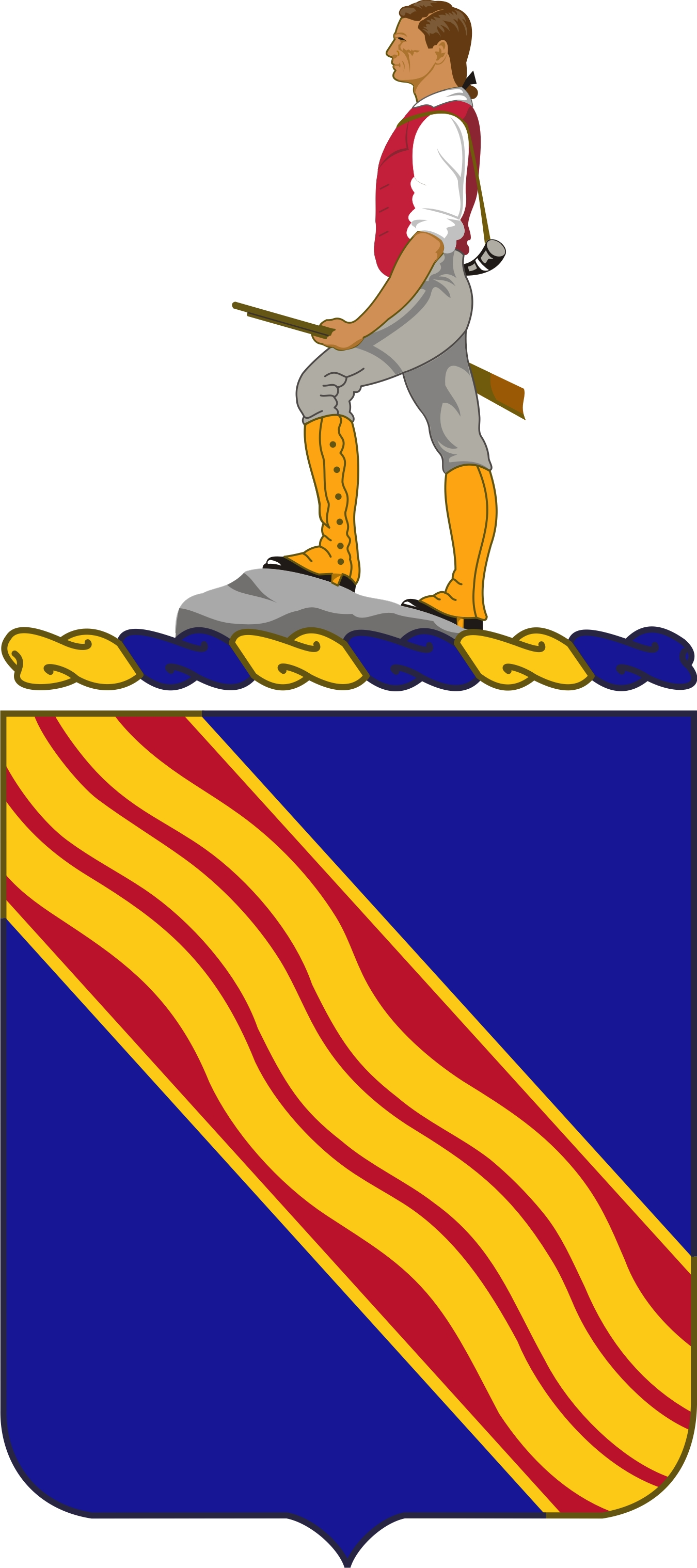
- Coat of arms of the 379th Infantry Regiment
- Active: 1918; 1921-1945; 1947-present
- Country: United States
- Branch: United States Army; National Army (1918); Organized Reserves (1921-1942); Army of the United States (1942–1945); United States Army Reserve (1947–present)
- Type: Infantry
- Size: Regiment
- Nickname: "Iron Men of Metz"
- Motto: "Ad Finem" (To the end)
- Engagements: World War I World War II

Commanders
- Notable commanders: Colonel Robert Lynn Bacon; Colonel Clifford P. Chapman

Insignia
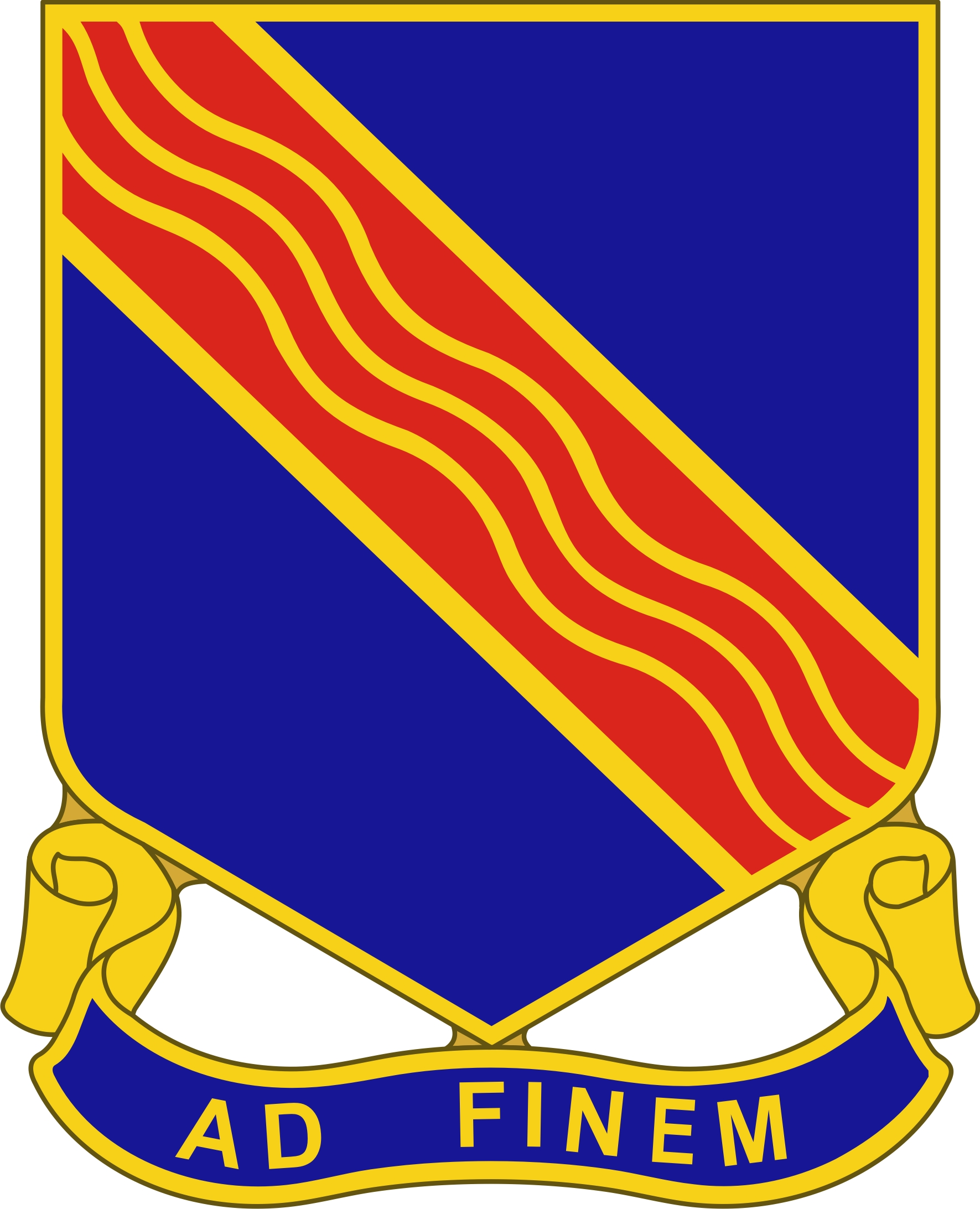
- DUI

The 379th Infantry Regiment is a unit of the United States Army. It was activated for World War I and World War II and historically has been part of the 95th Infantry Division. Elements of the organization have been part of the United States Army Reserve since 1947. On January 1, 1979 the division's four brigades were reorganized specifically for One Station Unit Training.

== History ==
=== World War I ===
The regiment was constituted on September 4, 1918 as part of the National Army as the 379th Infantry Regiment and assigned to the 95th Infantry Division. The division was organized on September 24, 1918 at Camp Sherman, Ohio. By the end of October, the division had about 6,400 men, and by the end of November after the Armistice with Germany, 7,600. Training did not progress beyond the elementary phases, and the division was ordered to be demobilized on November 30, with demobilization being completed on December 22.

=== Inter-War Era ===
Pursuant to the National Defense Act of 1920, the 95th Division and the 379th Infantry Regiment was reconstituted in the Organized Reserve on June 24, 1921, allotted to the Eighth Corps Area, and assigned to the XVIII Corps. The division was further allotted to the state of Oklahoma as its home area. The regiment was organized in November 1931 with its headquarters at Enid, Oklahoma.

=== World War II ===
The regiment was ordered into active duty on July 15, 1942 at reorganized at Camp Swift, Texas. The regiment landed with the rest of the 95th Infantry Division in France in September 1944. The regiment fought with the rest of the division during the Battle of Metz, the regiment saw particularly deadly fighting near Fort Jeanne d'Arc, Group Fortifications Francois-de-Guise, and Fort Driant, all of which were part of the Forts of Metz.

During the attacks at Fort Jean d'Arc the 2nd Battalion which consisted of elements of the 379th was situated near Gravelotte. Division headquarters estimated that Fort Jean d'Arc consisted of approximately 8,000 Germans including the entire 462nd Volksgrenadier Division and roughly half of the 19th Infantry Division. According to Captain John W. Barnes "the 2nd Battalion of the 379th Infantry was to attack on the left in the 379th Infantry zone and capture the high ground along the ridge between FORTS JEANNE D'ARC and DE GUISE and, on order, attack capture the high ground southeast of FORT JEANNE D'ARC. The Battalion Commander, Lieutenant Colonel Golson, planned to attack with Companies E and F abreast. G Company (-) in reserve was to move on orders of the Battalion Commander, and H Company was to support the attack with all of its weapons in general support". During the ensuing attack on the fort Lieutenant Colonel Golson, the Battalion Commander, along with the Captains of Companies E and F were seriously wounded, a platoon of Company F was also virtually wiped out.

The Regiment later took part in the advance across the Moselle and Saar rivers, the Battle of Saarlautern, the capture of the Ruhr pocket, and the final advance into Germany to the Leipzig area.The regiment was inactivated on October 12, 1945 at Camp Shelby. According to the official 95th Division Memorial website, the 95th Infantry Division had fought in Europe for nearly 12 months involving 145 days of combat including a continuous period of more than 100 days. The 95th Infantry Division captured more than 439 centers of population, including Germany's ninth largest city, Dortmund.

During the Second World War the 379th Regiment was commanded by the following officers:

Rank	Name	Date
Colonel	Clifford P. Chapman	August 17, 1944
Colonel	Robert Lynn Bacon	November 24, 1944
Lieutenant Colonel	Aubrey W. Akin	April 27, 1945

=== Post-World War II ===
The regiment was activated again on February 12, 1947 in the Organized Reserves with its Headquarters at Hot Springs, Arkansas. The Organized Reserves were redesignated as the Organized Reserve Corps on March 25, 1948 and later redesignated as the United States Army Reserve on July 9, 1952. The regimental headquarters was moved to Little Rock, Arkansas on January 31, 1955. The regiment was redesignated on April 1, 1959 as the 379th Regiment, an element of the 95th Division (Training), headquartered at Little Rock.

- Reorganized on December 30, 1967 to consist of the 1st and 2nd Battalions, elements of the 95th Division (Training).
- Reorganized on September 1, 1971 to consist of the 1st, 2nd, and 3rd Battalions, elements of the 95th Division (Training).
- Reorganized on October 1, 1994 to consist of the 1st, 2nd, and 3rd Battalions, elements of the 95th Division (Institutional Training).
- Reorganized on January 13, 1995 to consist of the 2nd and 3rd Battalions, elements of the 95th Division (Institutional Training).
- Reorganized on October 16 - November 16, 1996 to consist of the 1st and 2nd Battalions, elements of the 95th Division (Institutional Training).
- Reorganized on October 19, 2001 to consist of the 1st, 2nd, and 3rd Battalions, elements of the 95th Division (Institutional Training).

== Distinctive Unit Insignia ==
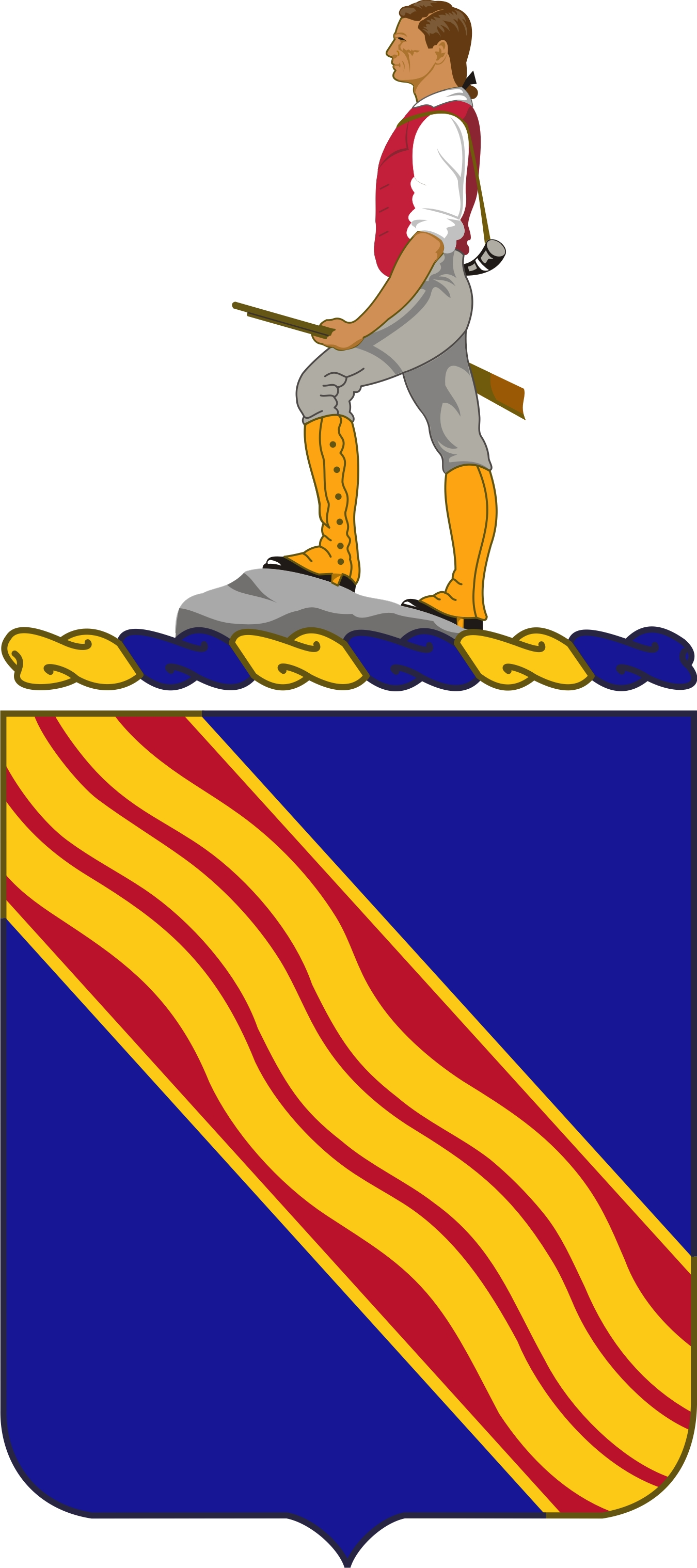
379th Infantry Regiment's Coat of arms

The 379th Infantry Regiment's distinctive unit insignia (DUI) and coat of arms depict an azure blue shield "on a bend with gules fimbriated or three bendlets wavy of the like", blue being the traditional color of infantry.

The regiment's motto, Ad Finem, appears on the DUI and is a Latin phrase that means “To the End.” The coat of arms of the 379th Infantry depicts the statue called The Lexington Minuteman that was sculpted by Henry Hudson Kitson and is located at the Lexington Battle Green.

== Campaign Participation Credit ==
The 379th Infantry Regiment's campaign participation credit includes:

World War II

- Northern France
- Rhineland
- Ardennes-Alsace
- Central Europe

== Notable Members ==
- Charles R. Hughes: Private in Company E, 379th Infantry Regiment. Hughes was from Coatesville, Pennsylvania and enrolled at West Chester University shortly before the war. Hughes served as a scout for company E, Hughes is noted for having eliminated an entire enemy squad of Waffen-SS soldiers while being severely wounded in his left leg. Hughes later attended the University of Utah.
- Lawrence T. Burdick: Captain of Company E, 379th Infantry Regiment. Lawrence was from Edgerton, Wisconsin, he had previously served in the Wisconsin National Guard in the Headquarter Company of the 128th Infantry Regiment before being placed on active duty and transferred to the 95th Infantry Division. Lawrence was severely wounded in action in the back by German mortar shrapnel near the Maginot Line, specifically Fort Jeanne d'Arc near Metz while leading Company E and much of the 2nd Battalion in a frontal assault. Burdick was awarded the Purple Heart, the Bronze Star Medal, and the Silver Star for his actions at Fort Jean d'Arc and was later promoted to the rank of Major.
