= 378th Infantry Regiment =

Unit of the United States Army

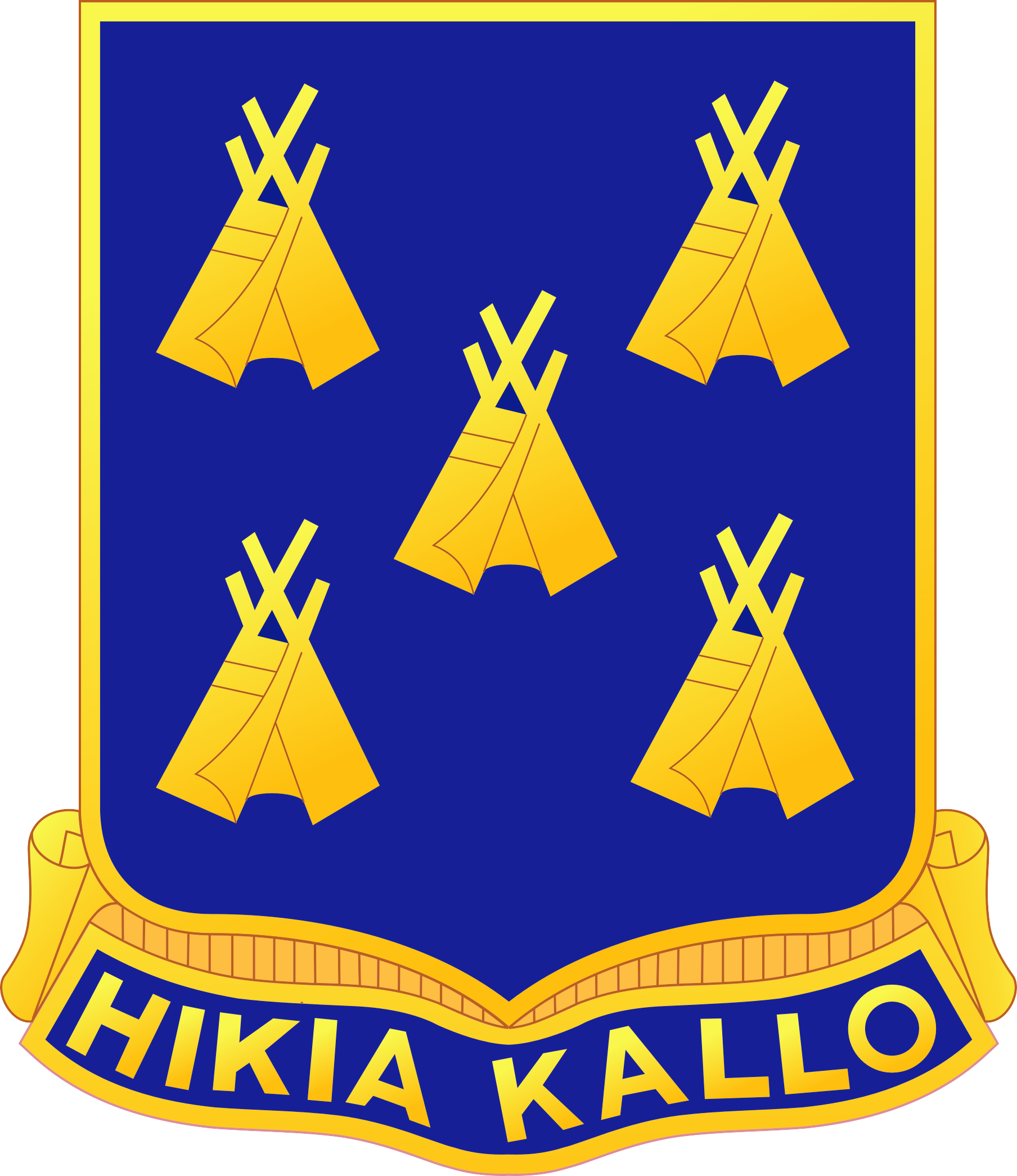
- Distinctive Unit Insignia of the 378th Infantry Regiment
- Active: 1918; 1921-1945; 1947-present
- Country: United States
- Branch: United States Army: National Army (1918); Organized Reserves (1921-1942); Army of the United States (1942–1945); United States Army Reserve (1947–present)
- Type: Infantry
- Motto: Hikia Kallo
- Engagements: World War I World War II; Global war on terrorism

Commanders
- Notable commanders: Colonel Samuel Tankersley Williams

The 378th Infantry Regiment is a unit of the United States Army. It was activated for World War I and World War II. Elements of the organization have been part of the United States Army Reserve since 1947 and participated in the global war on terrorism.

== History ==
=== World War I ===
The 378th Infantry Regiment was constituted on September 4, 1918, as a unit of World War I's National Army and assigned to the 189th Infantry Brigade, a unit of the 95th Division. The division was organized as a square division and trained at Camp Sherman, Ohio. The Armistice of November 11, 1918 ended the war before the 95th Division had deployed to France to enter the front lines. It was demobilized on November 30, 1918.

=== Post-World War I ===
Per the National Defense Act of 1920, the 378th Infantry was reconstituted in the Organized Reserve on 24 June 1921, assigned to the 95th Division, and allotted to the Eighth Corps Area. It was initiated on 24 January 1922 with the regimental headquarters at McAlester, Oklahoma. Subordinate battalion headquarters were concurrently organized as follows: 1st Battalion at Weleetka, Oklahoma; 2nd Battalion at Haileysville, Oklahoma; and 3rd Battalion at Fort Gibson, Oklahoma. Subordinate units of the regiment were relocated 9 September 1923 as follows: 1st Battalion at Poteau, Oklahoma; 2nd Battalion at Okmulgee, Oklahoma; and 3rd Battalion at Atoka, Oklahoma. The regimental band was organized in September 1923 at McAlester. The regiment conducted annual summer training with battalions of the 38th and 29th Infantry Regiments at Fort Sill, Oklahoma, and also conducted infantry Citizens' Military Training Camps some years at Fort Sill as an alternate form of summer training. The primary ROTC "feeder" school for new Reserve lieutenants for the regiment was Oklahoma A&M College in Stillwater, Oklahoma.

=== World War II ===
The 95th Division was reorganized as a triangular division for World War II, and its brigade headquarters were inactivated. The regiment was ordered to active military service on July 15, 1942, and was reorganized at Camp Swift, Texas. The 377th, 378th, and 379th Infantry Regiments underwent individual soldier and collective unit training at posts in the United States, including Camp Coxcomb, California. In August 1944, the 95th Division arrived in England, and in September it entered combat in France.

From the fall of 1944 until the end of the war in April 1945, the regiments of the 95th Division took part in several campaigns, including, Normandy, Northern France, Rhineland, Ardennes-Alsace, and Central Europe. After the war, the 95th Division returned to the United States, and it was inactivated at Camp Shelby, Mississippi on October 12, 1945.

=== Post-World War II ===
On March 14, 1947, the 378th Infantry was reactivated as a unit of the Organized Reserves with its headquarters in Oklahoma City, Oklahoma. In 1952, the Organized Reserve Corps was redesignated the United States Army Reserve. On April 1, 1959, the regiment was reorganized and redesignated the 378th Regiment, a unit of the 95th Division (Training). On September 3, 1962, the regiment's headquarters was moved to Lawton, Oklahoma.

On December 30, 1967, the 378th Regiment was reorganized to consist of the 1st, 2nd, and 3rd Battalions, elements of the Army Reserve's 95th Division (Training). On October 1, 1994, the regiment was reorganized as 1st, 2nd, and 3rd Battalions, elements of the Reserve's 95th Division (Institutional Training). A January 13, 1995 reorganization resulted in the 378th Infantry being designated as 3rd Battalion, 378th Regiment, a unit of the 95th Division (Institutional Training).

On October 16, 1996, the 378th Infantry was reorganized as 1st, 2nd, and 3nd Battalions, elements of the 95th Division (Institutional Training). Following the attacks of September 11, 2001, units of the 95th Division, including the 378th Regiment were ordered to active military duty as part of the global war on terrorism. On October 1, 2007, 1st Battalion, 378th Infantry was relieved from assignment to the 95th Division and assigned to the 98th Division (Institutional Training). On September 16, 2008, the 98th Division was redesignated the 98th Training Division. On September 16, 2009, the 95th Division was redesignated as the 95th Training Division.

== Distinctive unit insignia ==
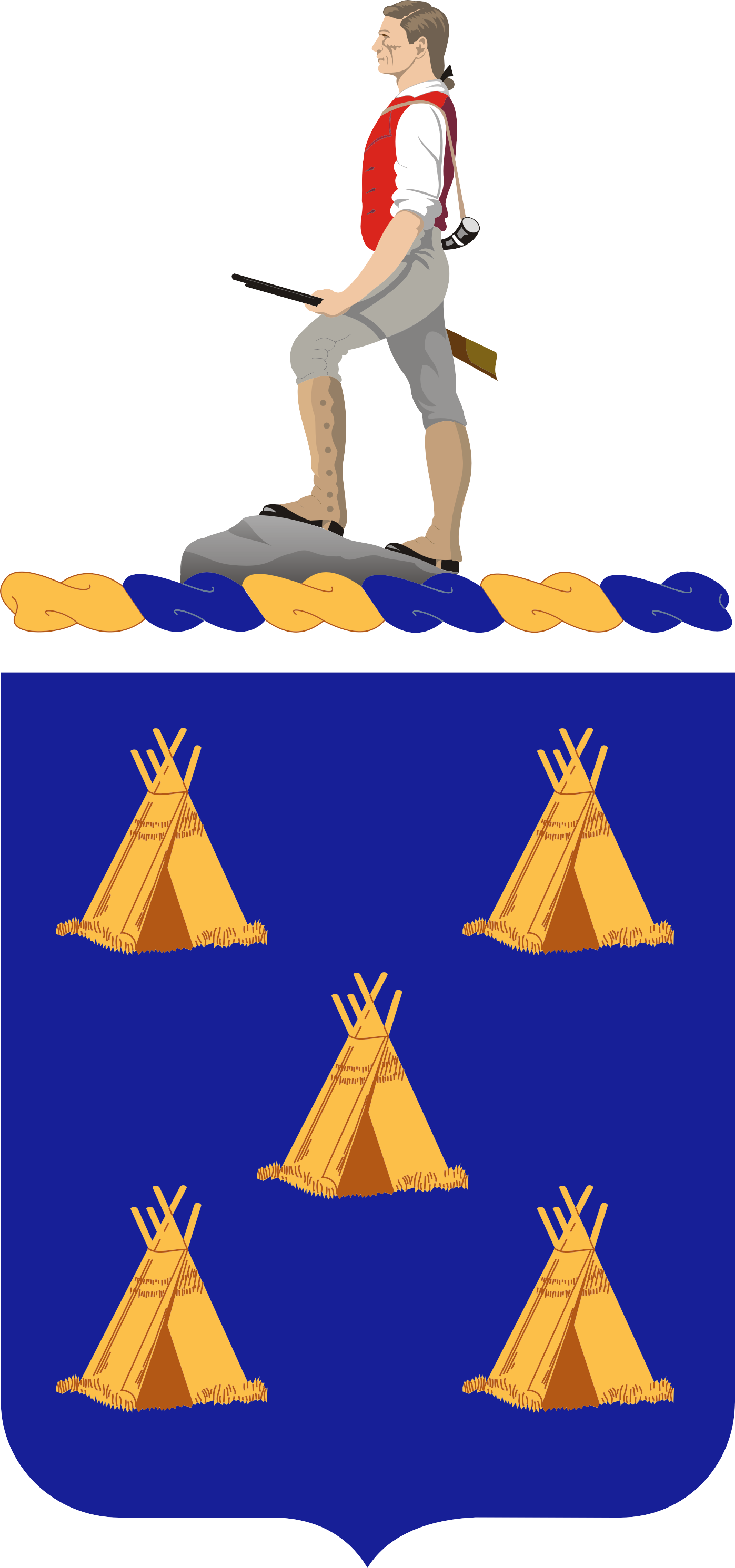
Coat of arms of the 378th Infantry Regiment

The 378th Infantry Regiment's distinctive unit insignia (DUI) and coat of arms depict five wigwams, organized in rows of two, one, and two on a blue field. Blue represents the Infantry, and the five wigwams the Five Civilized Tribes of Oklahoma, where the regiment was organized— the Choctaw, Cherokee, Creek, Chickasaw, and Seminole.

The regiment's motto, Hikia Kallo, appears on the DUI and is a Choctaw phrase that means “Stand Firm.” The coat of arms of the 378th Infantry depicts the statue called The Lexington Minuteman that was sculpted by Henry Hudson Kitson.

== Campaign participation credit ==
The 378th Infantry Regiment's campaign participation credit includes:

World War II

- Normandy
- Northern France
- Rhineland
- Ardennes-Alsace
- Central Europe

== Decorations ==
2nd Battalion, 378th Infantry is entitled to the following World War II decorations:

- Presidential Unit Citation (Army), Streamer embroidered MOSELLE RIVER
- French Croix de Guerre with Palm, Streamer embroidered METZ

== Notable members ==
- Emmett H. Walker Jr., platoon leader in Cannon Company, 378th Infantry Regiment during World War II. Attained the rank of lieutenant general as Chief of the National Guard Bureau.
