= 95th Training Division =

Active United States Army formation

- 95th Infantry Division shoulder sleeve insignia
- Active: 4 September 1918–22 December 1918 (National Army); 24 June 1921–15 October 1945 (Organized Reserves); 13 May 1947–1 April 1959 (Army Reserve); 1 April 1959–present (95th Training Div.)
- Country: United States
- Branch: United States Army Reserve
- Type: Training
- Size: Division
- Part of: 108th Training Command
- Garrison/HQ: Fort Sill, Oklahoma
- Nicknames: "Iron Men of Metz" (special designation) "Victory Division"
- Engagements: World War II; Northern France; Rhineland; Ardennes-Alsace; Central Europe

Commanders
- Current commander: Brigadier General Stephen Case
- Command Sergeant Major: CSM Stephen Raney

Insignia
- Distinctive unit insignia

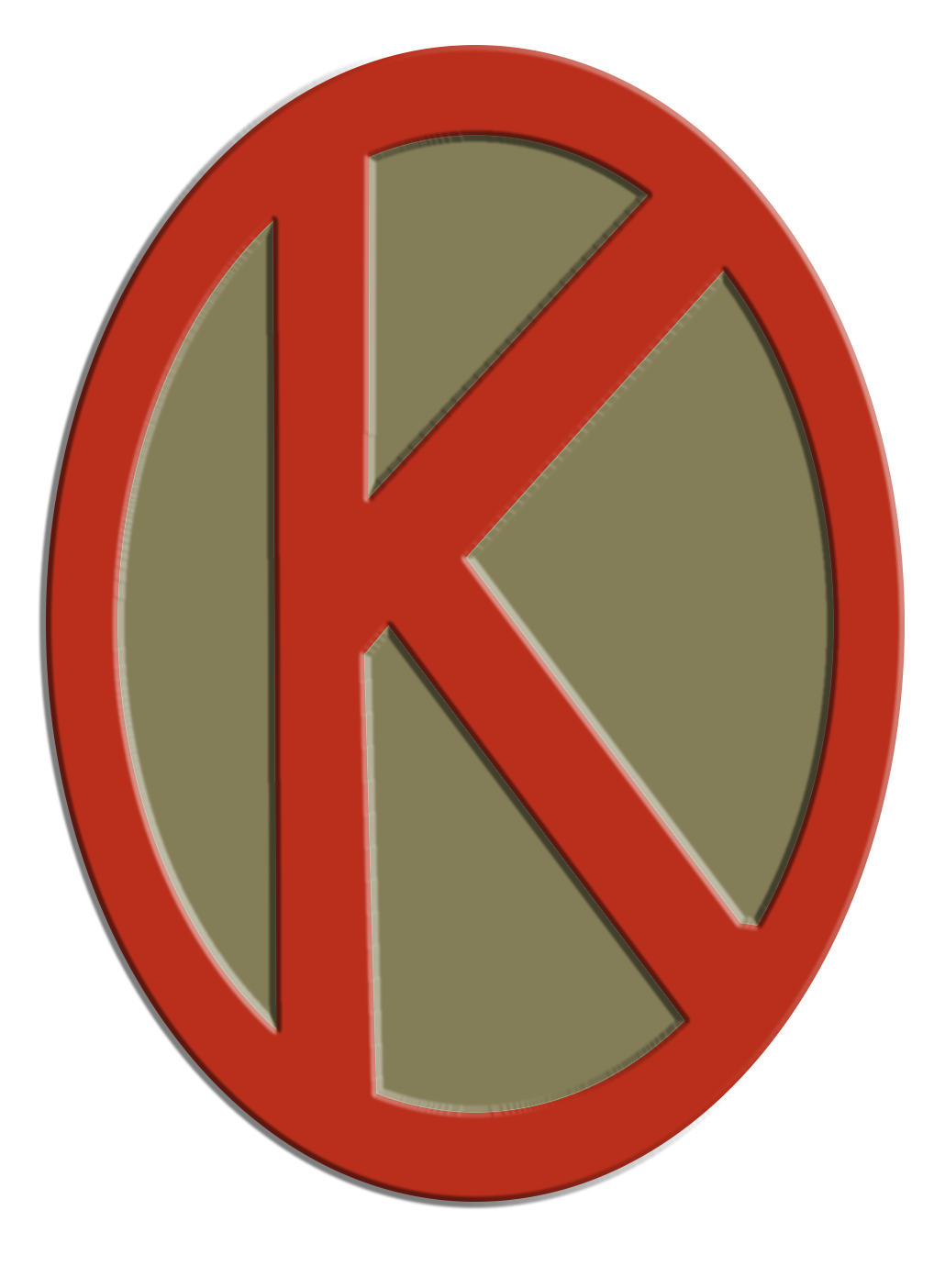
- 95th Infantry Division WWI "OK" Patch

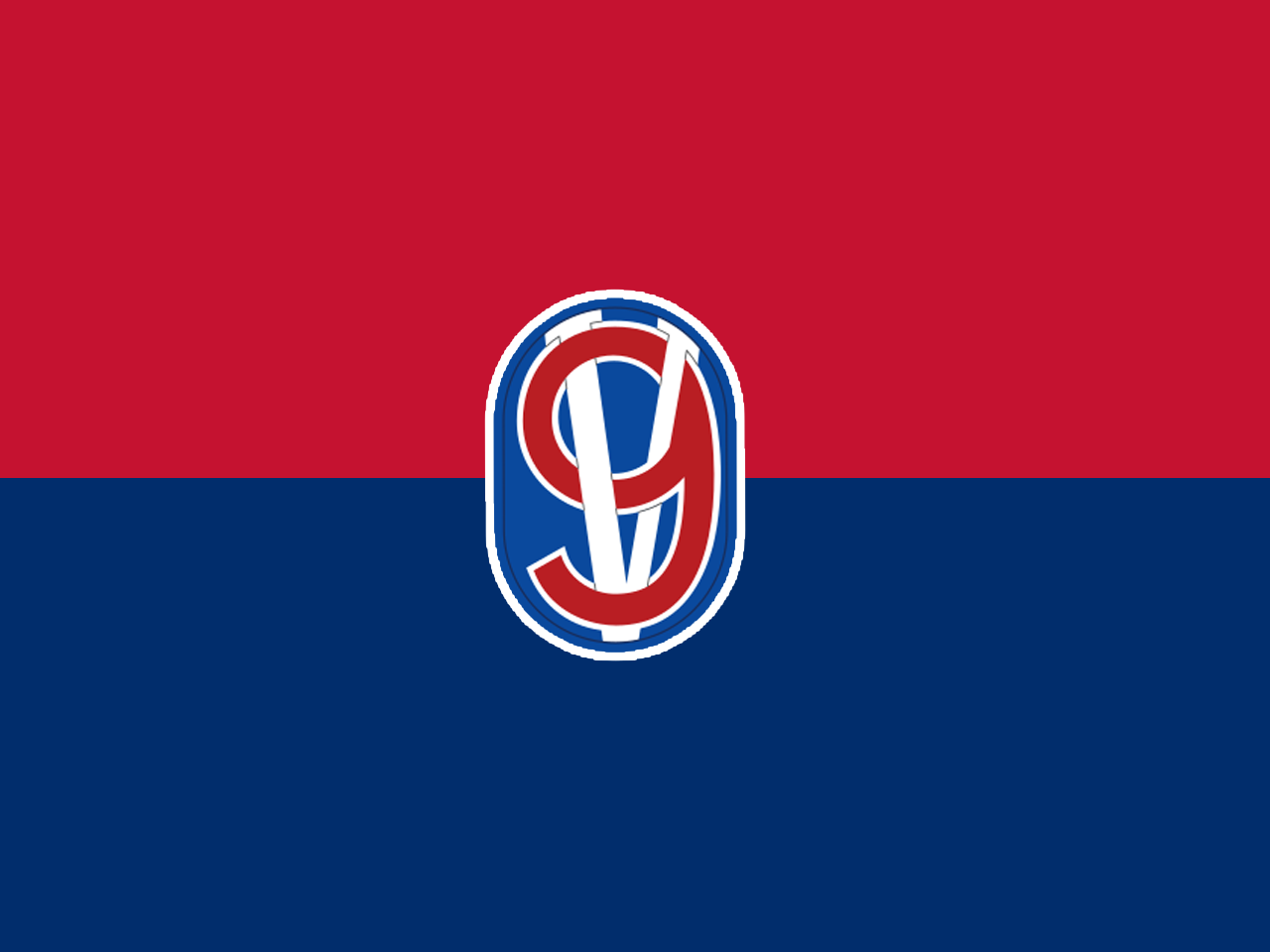
- Flag of the United States Army 95th Training Division

The 95th Infantry Division, created in 1918 as an infantry division of the United States Army, exists today as the 95th Training Division, a United States Army Reserve component headquartered at Fort Sill, Oklahoma. One of three training divisions of the 108th Training Command, it provides Initial Entry Training to new Army Reserve recruits.

The 95th was activated too late to deploy for World War I, but remained in the Army's reserve until World War II, when it was sent to Europe. The division became known for repelling fierce German counterattacks and in 1944 was nicknamed the "Iron Men of Metz" for liberating and defending the town. In April 1945, the 95th discovered a German prison and civilian labor camp in the town of Werl.

After World War II, the division spent a brief period in reserve before being activated as one of the Army's training divisions. Since then, the division's structure has changed several times to adapt to new training roles—for example, by activating regimental and brigade commands or by having subordinate units assigned to or removed from its command.

The 95th Infantry Division was recognized as a liberating unit by the United States Army Center of Military History and the United States Holocaust Memorial Museum in 1995.

== History ==
=== World War I ===
The 95th Division was first constituted on 4 September 1918 in the National Army. The division, minus the 377th and 378th Infantry Regiments of the 189th Infantry Brigade and the 170th Field Artillery Brigade (including the 320th Ammunition Train), were organized at Camp Sherman, Ohio, in September. The 377th and 378th Infantry Regiments were intended to be organized in France from the 1st and 2nd Pioneer Infantry Regiments, while the 170th Field Artillery Brigade was organized in September at Camp Zachary Taylor and Camp Knox, Kentucky. By the end of October, the division had about 6,400 men, and by the end of November after the Armistice with Germany, 7,600. Training did not progress beyond the elementary phases, and the division was ordered to be demobilized on 30 November, with demobilization being completed on 22 December. The division was commanded by:

- Colonel Julien Edmund Victor Gaujot (acting), 23–25 September 1918
- Colonel Edward Croft (acting), 25 September 1918 – 24 October 1918
- Brigadier General Mathew C. Smith, 24 October 1918 – 22 December 1918

=== Interwar period ===
As ordered by the National Defense Act of 1920, the 95th Division was reconstituted in the Organized Reserve on 24 June 1921, allotted to the Eighth Corps Area, and assigned to the XVIII Corps. The division was further allotted to the state of Oklahoma as its home area. The division headquarters was organized on 31 August 1921 at the Oklahoma State Capitol building in Oklahoma City. It was moved on 3 May 1922 to the Tradesmen's National Bank Building in that city, and moved once again in August 1924 to 203-1/2 West Grand Avenue. The headquarters remained there until activated for World War II. To maintain communications with the officers of the division, the chief of staff published a newsletter titled "The Observation Post." The newsletter informed the division's members of such things as when and where the inactive training sessions were to be held, what the division's summer training quotas were, where the camps were to be held, and which units would be assigned to help conduct the Citizens' Military Training Camps (CMTC).

The designated mobilization and training station for the division was Fort Sill, Oklahoma, where much of the 95th Division's training activities occurred in the interwar years. The subordinate infantry regiments of the division held their summer training with the 3rd Battalion, 20th Infantry Regiment, 1925–27; 1st Battalion, 38th Infantry Regiment, 1927–33; and the 3rd Battalion, 29th Infantry Regiment, 1933–39 at Fort Sill. Other units, such as the special troops, artillery, engineers, aviation, medical, and quartermaster, trained at various posts in the Eighth Corps Area. For example, the division's artillery trained at Fort Sill with the 1st Field Artillery; the 320th Engineer Regiment trained at Fort Sam Houston, Texas, and Fort Logan, Colorado, with the 2nd Engineer Regiment; the 320th Medical Regiment trained at Fort Sam Houston with the 2nd Medical Regiment; and the 320th Observation Squadron trained at Brooks Field, Texas. In addition to the unit training camps, the infantry regiments of the division rotated responsibility to conduct the CMTC training held at Fort Sill each year.

The division participated in several Eighth Corps Area and Third Army command post exercises with other Regular Army, National Guard, and Organized Reserve units, enabling division staff officers to practice the roles they would perform if the division were mobilized. Unlike the Regular and Guard units in the Eighth Corps Area, the 95th Division did not participate in the various Eighth Corps Area maneuvers and the Third Army maneuvers of 1938, 1940, and 1941 as an organized unit due to lack of enlisted personnel and equipment. Instead, the officers and a few enlisted reservists were assigned to Regular and Guard units to fill vacant slots and bring the units up to war strength for the exercises. Some officers were assigned duties as umpires or as support personnel. But for each maneuver, the division maximized the number of participants. For example, for the 1938 maneuver at Camp Bullis, Texas, the 95th Division provided 173 officers to the 2nd Division and 68 to the National Guard's 45th Division. Similar numbers participated in the two succeeding exercises.

The 320th Obs Squadron was constituted in the Organized Reserve (Oklahoma) as the 320th Observation Squadron on 24 June 1921; and disbanded 31 May 1942.

=== World War II ===
==== Mobilization ====
On 15 July 1942, the division was ordered into active military service and reorganized at Camp Swift, Texas. Major General Harry L. Twaddle was assigned to command, and he remained in this position until the division was demobilized at the end of the war. The 189th and 190th Infantry Brigades were disbanded as part of an army-wide elimination of brigades. Instead, the division was based around three infantry regiments, the 377th Infantry Regiment, the 378th Infantry Regiment, and the 379th Infantry Regiment. The 380th Infantry Regiment remained in an inactive status, and was disbanded on 11 November 1944. Over the next two years, the division trained extensively throughout the United States, including at Camp Coxcomb in California.

Before Organized Reserve infantry divisions were ordered into active military service, they were reorganized on paper as "triangular" divisions under the 1940 tables of organization. The headquarters companies of the two infantry brigades were consolidated into the division's cavalry reconnaissance troop, and one infantry regiment was removed by inactivation. The field artillery brigade headquarters and headquarters battery became the headquarters and headquarters battery of the division artillery. Its three field artillery regiments were reorganized into four battalions; one battalion was taken from each of the two 75 mm gun regiments to form two 105 mm howitzer battalions, the brigade's ammunition train was reorganized as the third 105 mm howitzer battalion, and the 155 mm howitzer battalion was formed from the 155 mm howitzer regiment. The engineer, medical, and quartermaster regiments were reorganized into battalions. In 1942, divisional quartermaster battalions were split into ordnance light maintenance companies and quartermaster companies, and the division's headquarters and military police company, which had previously been a combined unit, was split.

==== Division organization ====
The division consisted of the following units:

95th Infantry Division organization (click to enlarge)

- 95th Infantry Division
  - 95th Infantry Division Headquarters
  - 95th Cavalry Reconnaissance Troop (Mechanized) (M3 scout cars and then M8 Greyhound armored cars)
  - 377th Infantry Regiment
    - Headquarters and Headquarters Company
    - 3× Infantry battalions
      - each battalion consists of: 1× Headquarters and Headquarters Company, 3× Rifle companies, 1× Heavy Weapons Company
    - Cannon Company (T12 Gun Motor Carriages and T19 Howitzer Motor Carriages, later replaced by either M3 105mm towed howitzers or M7 Priest self propelled howitzers)
    - Anti-Tank Company (M3 37mm anti-tank guns, which were replaced by 1944 with M1 57mm anti-tank guns)
    - Service Company
  - 378th Infantry Regiment
    - same organization as 377th Infantry Regiment
  - 378th Infantry Regiment
    - same organization as 377th Infantry Regiment
  - 95th Infantry Division Artillery
    - Headquarters and Headquarters Battery
    - 358th Field Artillery Battalion
      - Headquarters and Headquarters Battery
      - 3× Batteries (M2 105mm towed howitzers)
      - Service Battery
    - 359th Field Artillery Battalion
      - same organization as 358th Field Artillery Battalion
    - 360th Field Artillery Battalion
      - Headquarters and Headquarters Battery
      - 3× Batteries (M1 155mm towed howitzers)
      - Service Battery
    - 920th Field Artillery Battalion
      - same organization as 358th Field Artillery Battalion
  - Headquarters Special Troops
    - Headquarters Company, 95th Infantry Division
    - 95th Signal Company
    - 95th Quartermaster Company
    - 795th Ordnance Light Maintenance Company
    - Military Police Platoon
    - 95th Infantry Division Band (attached)
  - 320th Engineer Combat Battalion
    - Headquarters and Headquarters and Service Company
    - 3× Engineer combat companies
  - 320th Medical Battalion
    - Headquarters and Headquarters Detachment
    - 3× Collecting companies
    - Clearing Company

==== Combat chronicle ====
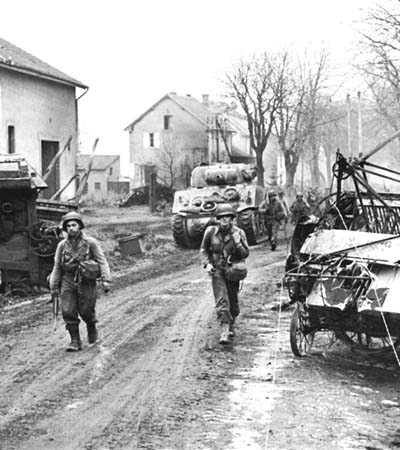
American soldiers of the 378th Infantry Regiment enter Metz, 1944.

Assigned to XIII Corps of the Ninth United States Army, Twelfth United States Army Group, the 95th Infantry Division sailed for England on 10 August 1944 and arrived seven days later. After more training, it moved on 15 September to France, where it was reassigned to III Corps. The division bivouacked near Norroy-le-Sec, from 1 to 14 October, then was assigned to XX Corps of the Third United States Army. On 19 October, the division was sent into combat in the Moselle bridgehead sector east of Moselle and South of Metz. It patrolled the Seille near Cheminot, captured the forts surrounding Metz, and repulsed enemy attempts to cross the river. During the defense of this town from repeated German attacks, the division received its nickname: "The Iron Men of Metz." On 1 November, elements went over to the offensive, reducing an enemy pocket east of Maizières-lès-Metz. On 8 November, these units crossed the Moselle River and advanced to Bertrange. Against heavy resistance, the 95th captured the forts surrounding Metz and captured the city by 22 November.

The division pushed toward the Saar on 25 November and entered Germany on the 28th. The 95th seized a Saar River bridge on 3 December and engaged in bitter house-to-house fighting for Saarlautern. Suburbs of the city fell and, although the enemy resisted fiercely, the Saar bridgehead was firmly established by 19 December. While some units went to an assembly area, others held the area against strong German attacks. On 2 February 1945, the division began moving to the Maastricht area in the Netherlands, and by 14 February, elements were in the line near Meerselo in relief of British units. During this time the division returned to the Ninth Army under XIX Corps, though saw temporary assignments to several other corps through the spring.

On 23 February, the division was relieved, and the 95th assembled near Jülich, Germany, on 1 March. It forced the enemy into a pocket near the Hitler Bridge at Uerdingen and cleared the pocket on 5 March, while elements advanced to the Rhine. From 12 March, the 95th established defenses in the vicinity of Neuss. Assembling east of the Rhine at Beckum on 3 April, it launched an attack across the Lippe River the next day and captured Hamm and Kamen on the 6th. After clearing the enemy pocket north of the Ruhr and the Möhne Rivers, the division took Werl and Unna on 9/10 April, Dortmund on 13 April and maintained positions on the north bank of the Ruhr. It held this position until the end of the war.

==== Casualties ====
- Total battle casualties: 6,591
- Killed in action: 1,205
- Wounded in action: 4,945
- Missing in action: 61
- Prisoner of war: 380

The division took 31,988 German prisoners. Soldiers of the division were awarded one Medal of Honor, 18 Distinguished Service Crosses, 1 British Military Cross, 14 Legion of Merit Medals, 665 Silver Star Medals, 15 Soldier's Medals, 2,992 Bronze Star Medals, and 162 Air Medals. The division was awarded one Presidential Unit Citation and four campaign streamers during its time in combat.

==== Demobilization ====
On 29 June 1945, the division returned to the United States, where it prepared to invade the Japanese island of Honshu as part of the First United States Army. After the war ended, the division remained under orders to deploy to the Pacific—until members staged a minor mutiny. Instead, the division was demobilized and its soldiers released from Army service. It was inactivated on 15 October 1945 at Camp Shelby, Mississippi.

=== Cold War ===
The division was reactivated on 13 May 1947 at Oklahoma City as a reserve unit.

In 1952, it swapped infantry regiments with the 75th Infantry Division, adding the 291st of Tulsa, Oklahoma, and losing the 377th, which had been activated after World War II and headquartered in New Orleans, Louisiana.

On 1 January 1955, the 291st Regiment was sent back to the 75th Infantry Division; it would be inactivated 30 days later. On 30 January, the 377th Regiment was reassigned to the 95th and its headquarters moved from New Orleans to Tulsa. That same day, the headquarters of the 379th Regiment was moved from Hot Springs, Arkansas, where it had been since 1947, to Little Rock, Arkansas.

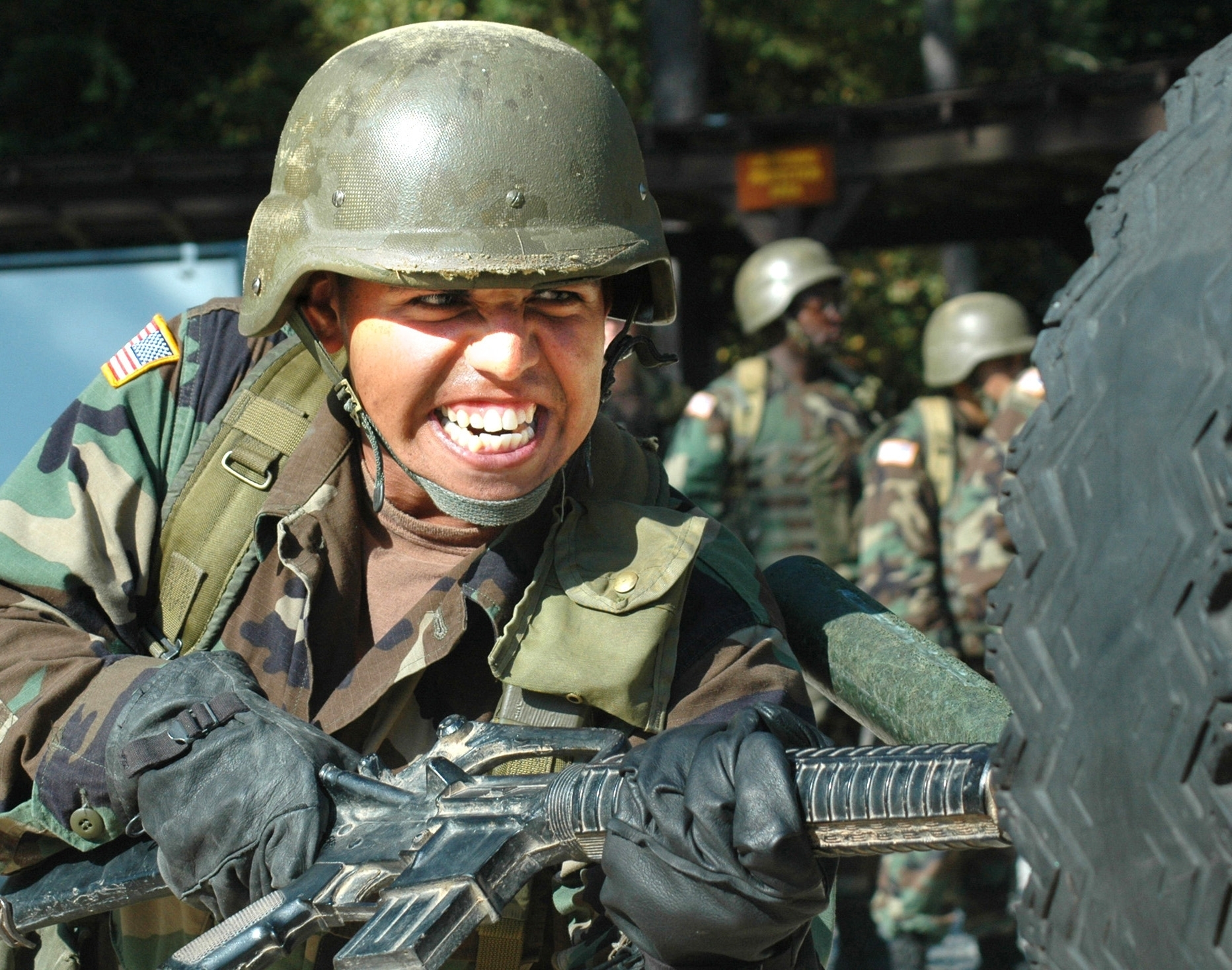
US Army recruits in Basic Combat Training.

On 1 April 1958, the 95th Infantry Division received a new designation—95th Division (Training)—and a new mission as one of the Army Reserve's 13 Training Divisions. Personnel trained for infantry combat, field artillery, military police and combat support roles were retrained to enable them to train others. The 95th Divisional Artillery became the 95th Regiment (Common Specialist Training) with headquarters at Shreveport, Louisiana. The 377th became the 377th Regiment (Basic Combat Training), as did the 378th and 379th, and all were reassigned new training sites. The division also once again added the 291st Regiment from the 75th; it was redesignated 291st Regiment (Advanced Individual Training).

In 1966, the division received a distinctive unit insignia.

In 1967, the division was reorganized according to the Reorganization Objective Army Divisions plan, part of an army-wide transformation. The division's former World War II components were reorganized into brigades. The division's former headquarters was reactivated as 1st Brigade, 95th Division at Tulsa, Oklahoma. The 920th Field Artillery Battalion became the 2nd Brigade, 95th Division, also in Tulsa. The 320th Engineer Battalion became the 3rd Brigade, 95th Division at Oklahoma City, and the 795th Ordnance Battalion became the 4th Brigade, 95th Division in Shreveport, Louisiana. In 1975, the division's center was changed to Midwest City, Oklahoma.

The division was located in three states: Oklahoma, Arkansas, and Louisiana. The 1st Brigade was headquartered in Tulsa and had elements of the 377th and 379th in regiments in its battalions. The 2nd Brigade was headquartered in Lawton, Oklahoma, with elements of the 378th and 379th Regiments. The 3rd Brigade was headquartered in Stillwater, Oklahoma, a move made in September 1975, and consisted of only 291st Regiment elements. The 4th Brigade was headquartered in Bossier City, Louisiana, a suburb of Shreveport, and included the 95th Regiment and one element of the 379th. The Committee Group was headquartered in Little Rock with no Regimental elements. The 95th Support Battalion was headquartered in Midwest City, Oklahoma, with the Division Headquarters, Headquarters and Headquarters Company, 95th Division Leadership Academy, and the 95th Division Maneuver Training Command. On 1 January 1979, the division's four brigades was reorganized specifically for one station unit training.

In October 1984, the 95th added the 809 troops of the 4073d US Army Reception Station, in Lafayette, Louisiana. The 402nd Brigade was also activated under the division's administrative control. It was designated to expand the training base for the Army's Field Artillery Training Center at Fort Sill, Oklahoma. In 1989, the division's location was returned to Oklahoma City.

=== Recent history ===
The 4155th United States Army Reserve School in Oklahoma City, Oklahoma, was planned to be inactivated in August 1996. Plans called for it to be transformed into the 7th Battalion, 95th Regiment, 4th Brigade, 95th Division.

The division continued its mission of training and operating one station unit training. In 1996, the division received three more brigades as the Army consolidated training commands. The 5th Brigade, 95th Division was activated in San Antonio, Texas; the 6th Brigade, 95th Division was activated in Topeka, Kansas; and the 7th Brigade, 95th Division was activated from the 95th Training Command in Little Rock.

In 2000, the brigade began training Reserve Officer's Training Corps cadets. The 8th Brigade, 95th Division was activated as a provisional unit in charge of ROTC units throughout the southwestern United States. In 2005, the division headquarters was moved to Fort Sill, the area's major training center, allowing it to better oversee training.

== Units in 2026 ==
The 95th Training Division is a subordinate unit of the 108th Training Command, which is tasked with providing Initial Entry Training (IET) to new recruits. The 95th Training Division provides Basic Combat Training (BCT), as well as One Station Unit Training (OSUT) for Military Police (MP) and Engineer recruits. One Station Unit Training combines Basic Combat Training and Advanced Individual Training (AIT) at one location. Besides providing training at their main training locations the division's battalions also operate numerous training detachments. As of January 2026 the following units are subordinated to the 95th Training Division:

- 95th Training Division (IET), at Fort Sill (OK)
  - 1st Brigade (IET), at Fort Sill (OK)
    - 1st Battalion, 354th Regiment (MP OSUT), in Tulsa (OK)
      - Detachment 2 (Bravo Company), 1st Battalion, 354th Regiment (MP OSUT), in Springfield (MO)
      - Detachment 3 (Charlie Company), 1st Battalion, 354th Regiment (MP OSUT), in Stillwater (OK)
      - Detachment 4 (Delta Company), 1st Battalion, 354th Regiment (MP OSUT), at Fort Chaffee (AR)
    - 2nd Battalion, 354th Regiment (BCT), in Grand Prairie (TX)
      - Detachment 1 (Alpha Company), 2nd Battalion, 354th Regiment (BCT), in Waco (TX)
      - Detachment 3 (Charlie Company), 2nd Battalion, 354th Regiment (BCT), in Bossier City (LA)
    - 1st Battalion, 355th Regiment (BCT), in Round Rock (TX)
      - Detachment 1 (Alpha Company), 1st Battalion, 355th Regiment (BCT), at Camp Bullis (TX)
      - Detachment 2 (Bravo Company), 1st Battalion, 355th Regiment (BCT), in Harlingen (TX)
      - Detachment 3 (Charlie Company), 1st Battalion, 355th Regiment (BCT), in Corpus Christi (TX)
      - Detachment 6 (Foxtrot Company), 1st Battalion, 355th Regiment (BCT), in Conroe (TX)
    - 2nd Battalion, 377th Regiment (BCT), in Lincoln (NE)
      - Detachment 1 (Alpha Company), 2nd Battalion, 377th Regiment (BCT), in Davenport (IA)
      - Detachment 2 (Bravo Company), 2nd Battalion, 377th Regiment (BCT), at Fort Snelling (MN)
      - Detachment 6 (Foxtrot Company), 2nd Battalion, 377th Regiment (BCT), at Fort Des Moines (IA)
    - 3rd Battalion, 378th Regiment (BCT), in Norman (OK)
      - Detachment 1 (Alpha Company), 3rd Battalion, 378th Regiment (BCT), at New Century AirCenter (KS)
      - Detachment 2 (Bravo Company), 3rd Battalion, 378th Regiment (BCT), in Belton (MO)
      - Detachment 5 (Echo Company), 3rd Battalion, 378th Regiment (BCT), at Fort Sill (OK)
      - Detachment 6 (Foxtrot Company), 3rd Battalion, 378th Regiment (BCT), in Amarillo (TX)
    - 2nd Battalion, 379th Regiment (TS), at Fort Sill (OK)
      - Detachment 1, 2nd Battalion, 379th Regiment (TS), in Arkadelphia (AR)
  - 2nd Brigade (BCT), in Vancouver (WA)
    - 2nd Battalion, 413th Regiment (BCT), at March Air Reserve Base (CA)
      - Detachment 2 (Bravo Company), 2nd Battalion, 413th Regiment (BCT), in San Diego (CA)
      - Detachment 3 (Charlie Company), 2nd Battalion, 413th Regiment (BCT), at Fort Shafter (HI)
      - Detachment 4 (Delta Company), 2nd Battalion, 413th Regiment (BCT), at Joint Forces Training Base – Los Alamitos (CA)
      - Detachment 5 (Echo Company), 2nd Battalion, 413th Regiment (BCT), in Eugene (OR)
    - 1st Battalion, 415th Regiment (BCT), in Phoenix (AZ)
      - Detachment 1 (Alpha Company), 1st Battalion, 415th Regiment (BCT), in Marana (AZ)
      - Detachment 4 (Delta Company), 1st Battalion, 415th Regiment (BCT), in Sloan (NV)
      - Detachment 5 (Echo Company), 1st Battalion, 415th Regiment (BCT), at Fort Douglas (UT)
      - Detachment 6 (Foxtrot Company), 1st Battalion, 415th Regiment (BCT), at Fort Carson (CO)
    - 3rd Battalion, 415th Regiment (BCT), at Fairchild Air Force Base (WA)
      - Detachment 1 (Alpha Company), 3rd Battalion, 415th Regiment (BCT), in Yakima (WA)
      - Detachment 2 (Bravo Company), 3rd Battalion, 415th Regiment (BCT), at Fort Harrison (MT)
      - Detachment 4 (Delta Company), 3rd Battalion, 415th Regiment (BCT), in Renton (WA)
      - Detachment 6 (Foxtrot Company), 3rd Battalion, 415th Regiment (BCT), in Boise (ID)
  - 3rd Brigade (IET), in Beaver Dam (WI)
    - 1st Battalion, 320th Regiment (MP OSUT), in Abingdon (VA)
      - Detachment 1 (Alpha Company), 1st Battalion, 320th Regiment (MP OSUT), at Joint Expeditionary Base Fort Story (VA)
      - Detachment 2 (Bravo Company), 1st Battalion, 320th Regiment (MP OSUT), in Suffolk (VA)
      - Detachment 3 (Charlie Company), 1st Battalion, 320th Regiment (MP OSUT), in Alexandria (VA)
      - Detachment 4 (Delta Company), 1st Battalion, 320th Regiment (MP OSUT), in Richmond (VA)
    - 1st Battalion, 330th Regiment (BCT), in Fort Wayne (IN)
      - Detachment 2 (Bravo Company), 1st Battalion, 330th Regiment (BCT), at Grissom Air Reserve Base (IN)
      - Detachment 4 (Delta Company), 1st Battalion, 330th Regiment (BCT), in Richmond (IN)
      - Detachment 5 (Echo Company), 1st Battalion, 330th Regiment (BCT), in Granite City (IL)
    - 2nd Battalion, 330th Regiment (EN OSUT), in Arlington Heights (IL)
      - Detachment 1 (Alpha Company), 2nd Battalion, 330th Regiment (EN OSUT), in Machesney Park (IL)
      - Detachment 4 (Delta Company), 2nd Battalion, 330th Regiment (EN OSUT), at Fort McCoy (WI)
      - Detachment 7 (Golf Company), 2nd Battalion, 330th Regiment (EN OSUT), in Quincy (IL)
    - 1st Battalion, 334th Regiment (TS), in Milwaukee (WI)
      - Detachment 1, 1st Battalion, 334th Regiment (TS), in Fraser (MI)
    - 3rd Battalion, 334th Regiment (BCT), in Milwaukee (WI)
      - Detachment 4 (Delta Company), 3rd Battalion, 334th Regiment (BCT), at Neenah (WI)
    - 1st Battalion, 390th Regiment (EN OSUT), in Amherst (NY)
      - Detachment 1 (Alpha Company), 1st Battalion, 390th Regiment (EN OSUT), in Gerry (NY)
      - Detachment 2 (Bravo Company), 1st Battalion, 390th Regiment (EN OSUT), in North Canton (OH)

Abbreviations: IET — Initial Entry Training; BCT — Basic Combat Training; MP — Military Police; EN — Engineer; OSUT — One Station Unit Training; TS — Training Support

== Heraldry ==
=== Shoulder sleeve insignia ===
The division's original shoulder sleeve insignia, adopted in the interwar period, was a monogram "O" and "K," to denote the division's assigned home area of the state of Oklahoma. On 29 August 1942, a revised shoulder sleeve insignia, consisting of an interlocked red "9" and white "V" on a blue oval background was approved for the 95th Infantry Division; the "9" and "V" refer to the unit's numerical designation, while the "V" also alludes to victory. The red, white, and blue are the American national colors. The insignia was subsequently authorized for the 95th Division (Training) on 24 June 1968. On 14 April 1972, its description was revised.

=== Distinctive unit insignia ===
The device commemorates the crossing of the Moselle River and the breakthrough at Metz, symbolized by the blue wavy band and the black fortress. The blue wavy band further alludes to the Distinctive Unit Citation the division received for this action in World War II. The arrow alludes to the letter "V" for victory, and the nickname given the organization.

== Honors ==
=== Unit decorations ===
In 2014 ceremony in Columbus, Indiana, a bridge was named "Iron Men of Metz Memorial Bridge"

=== Campaign streamers ===
Conflict	Streamer	Year(s)
World War II	Northern France	1944
World War II	Rhineland	1944–1945
World War II	Ardennes-Alsace	1944–1945
World War II	Central Europe	1945

== Legacy ==
In the 1962 film, Hell Is for Heroes, the actors wear the 95th Division's shoulder patch on their uniforms. The division is also an element of the Legacy of the Aldenata book series.

The 2021 film, Dear Sirs follows the path of Sgt. Silvio Pedri who was sent on a mission to cross the Moselle river near Metz, France and was captured as a POW.

== Notable personnel ==
- Harry Ashmore (1916–1998), journalist
- Ernest L. Massad (1908–1993), oil tycoon
- Lawrence Theodore Burdick (1908–2001): A descendant of Robert Burdick of Rhode Island, Lawrence Burdick was the Captain of Company E, 379th Infantry Regiment. Received the Silver Star and Bronze Star in November, 1944 during the battle of Fort Jeanne d'Arc. Burdick retired from the military in 1968 with the rank of Colonel, he is buried in Arlington National Cemetery.
- Andrew Miller (1916–1944); received the Medal of Honor in World War II during the division's fight for Metz.
- Jerry Rosholt (1923–2008), writer
- Walter Bedell Smith (1895–1961), General Dwight D. Eisenhower's chief of staff at Allied Forces Headquarters; served with the division during World War I.
- Lieutenant General Emmett H. Walker Jr. (1924–2007)

== Sources ==
- McGrath, John J. (2004). The Brigade: A History: Its Organization and Employment in the US Army. Combat Studies Institute Press. ISBN 978-1-4404-4915-4.
- Army Almanac: A Book of Facts Concerning the Army of the United States. United States Government Printing Office. 1959. ASIN B0006D8NKK.
- Order of Battle of the United States Army: World War II European Theater of Operations. Department of the Army. 1945. OCLC 7764194.
