= Mathew C. Smith =

U.S. Army brigadier general

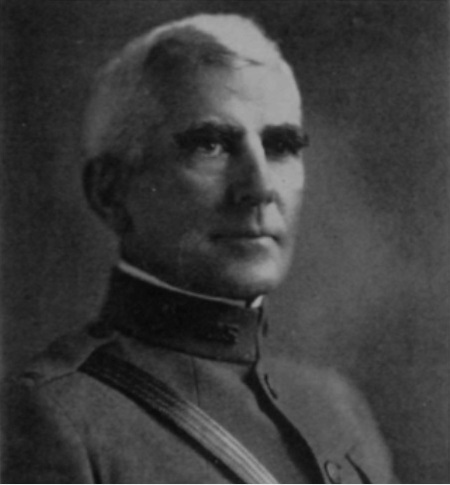
- From the July 1942 edition of Assembly magazine
- Born: March 25, 1868; Camden, Alabama, U.S.
- Died: March 11, 1941 (aged 72); Beverly Hills, California, U.S.
- Burial place: Arlington National Cemetery
- Alma mater: Lehigh University (attended); United States Military Academy; United States Army Command and General Staff College; United States Army War College
- Spouse: Celeste Yeteve Pickering (m. 1907–1941)
- Children: 4
- Military career
- Service: United States Army
- Service years: 1893–1932
- Rank: Brigadier General
- Service number: 0-428
- Unit: U.S. Army Cavalry Branch
- Commands: Troop K, 14th Cavalry Regiment; 129th Infantry Regiment; 309th Cavalry Regiment; 56th Field Artillery Regiment; 95th Division; Panama Pacific General Depot
- Conflicts: Spanish–American War; Philippine–American War; Pancho Villa Expedition; World War I

Mathew Charles Smith (March 25, 1868 – March 11, 1941) was a career officer in the United States Army. An 1893 graduate of the United States Military Academy (West Point), he was a veteran of the Spanish–American War, Philippine–American War, the Pancho Villa Expedition, and World War I and served from 1893 to 1932. He attained the rank of brigadier general and his command assignments included the 129th Infantry Regiment, 309th Cavalry Regiment, 56th Field Artillery Regiment, 95th Division, and Panama Pacific General Depot.

In retirement, Smith was a resident Beverly Hills, California. He died in Beverly Hills on March 11, 1941, and was buried at Arlington National Cemetery.

== Early life ==
Mathew C. Smith was born in Camden, Alabama on March 25, 1868, the son of Irish immigrants Mathew Thomas Smith and Mary (Comerford) Smith. Mathew T. Smith was a Confederate veteran of the American Civil War, and later operated a successful wagon and carriage making business. Mathew C. Smith was raised in Camden and Birmingham, and attended the public schools of both. After high school, Smith attended Ulrich's Preparatory School in Bethlehem, Pennsylvania, then studied civil engineering at Lehigh University for two years.

In 1889, Smith obtained an appointment to the United States Military Academy (West Point). He graduated in June 1893 ranked 30th of 51 and received his commission as a second lieutenant of Cavalry. He was assigned to the 2nd Cavalry Regiment at Fort Huachuca, Arizona.

== Start of career ==
Smith served at Fort Huachuca until October 1894, when he was posted to Fort Wingate, New Mexico. In August 1897, he was assigned to the West Point faculty as a professor of modern languages. During the Spanish–American War, he served as quartermaster and commissary officer for United States Volunteers in Massachusetts (April–June 1898), mustering-in officer for volunteers in New York (July–August 1898), and on recruiting duty in Columbus, Ohio (February–June 1899). He was promoted to first lieutenant in March 1899.

In February 1901, Smith was promoted to captain in the 14th Cavalry Regiment and posted to Fort Leavenworth, Kansas as the regimental adjutant. After duty at Fort Grant, Arizona, from 1903 to 1905, he served with his regiment on the island of Mindanao during the Philippine–American War. After returning to the United States, he was assigned to duty at the Presidio of Monterey, California. Following the 1906 San Francisco earthquake, Smith was assigned to the Presidio of San Francisco and took part in recovery efforts.

== Continued career ==
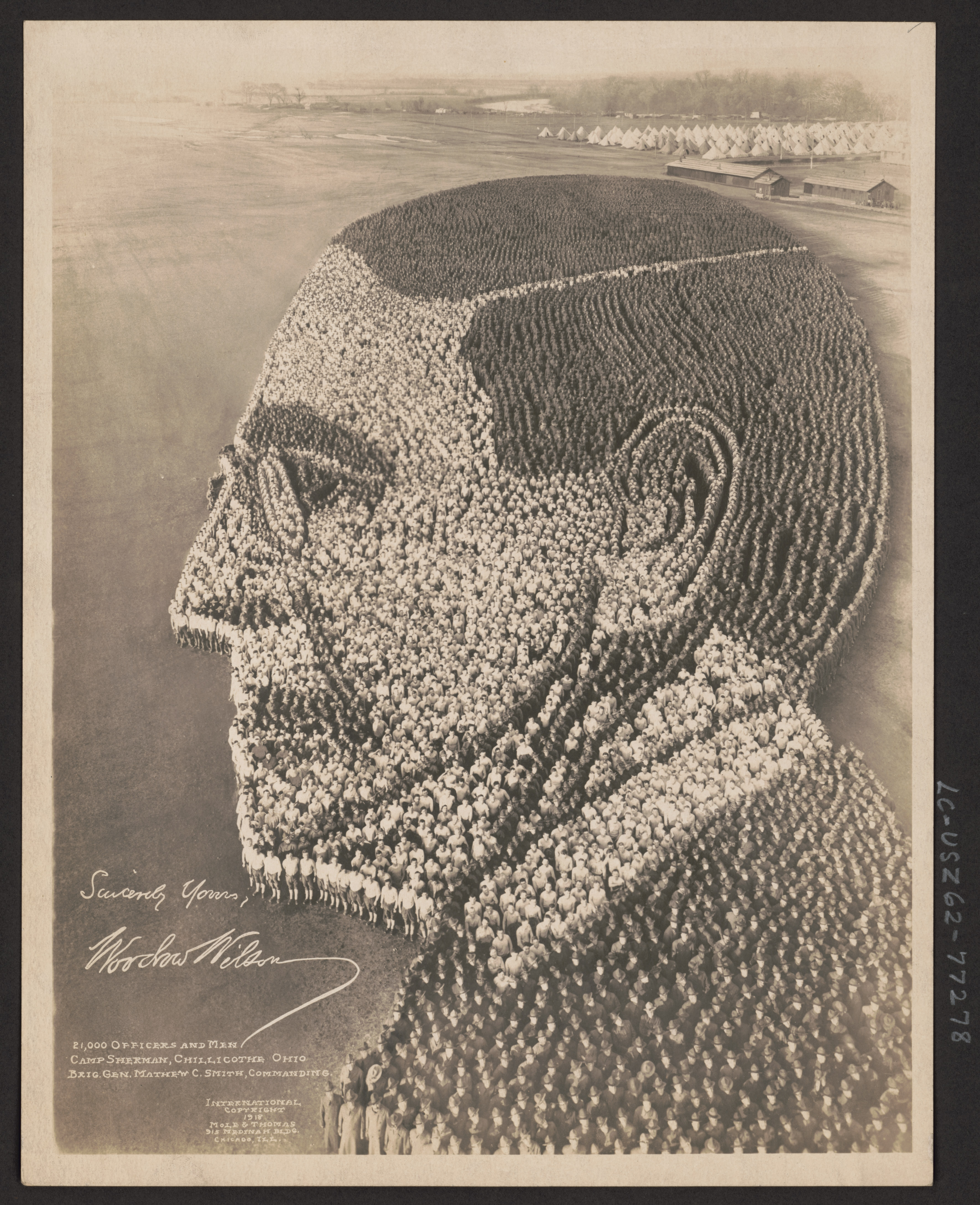
Soldiers of Camp Sherman, Ohio under Smith's command formed to depict President Woodrow Wilson in 1918

From June 1907 to July 1909, Smith commanded Troop K, 14th Infantry, first at Fort Boise, Idaho, then at Fort Walla Walla, Washington. He was assigned as regimental adjutant again in October 1909, and served at Fort Stotsenburg, Philippines until June 1911. From June 1911 to June 1913, Smith as a student at Fort Leavenworth, completing first the School of the Line (now the United States Army Command and General Staff College) as a Distinguished Graduate, then the Army Staff School (now the United States Army War College).

From June 1913 to September 1915, Smith commanded Troop K, first at Fort Sam Fordyce near Havana, Texas, then at Rio Grande City, Texas. He was then assigned to Fort Riley, Kansas, where he attended the Mounted Service School. From December 1915 to January 1916, he commanded Troop K at Eagle Pass, Texas during the Pancho Villa Expedition. Smith was then transferred to the 9th Cavalry Regiment, with which he served at Camp Stotsenburg, Philippines until August 1917. He was promoted to major on July 1, 1917.

== Later career ==
With the army expanding for World War I, Smith was promoted to lieutenant colonel on July 24, 1917, and temporary colonel on August 5. He served with the 165th Depot Brigade at Camp Travis near Fort Sam Houston, Texas from September to December 1917, where he aided in organizing and training the 90th Division. In January and February 1918, he commanded the 129th Infantry Regiment during its organization and training at Camp Logan, Texas. From February to August 1918, he commanded the 309th Cavalry Regiment, first at Camp Logan, then at Fort Sam Houston. When the army determined that Cavalry units were not required for combat in Europe, Cavalry regiments were reorganized as Field Artillery, and Smith was assigned to command the 56th Field Artillery Regiment. He attended the Field Artillery School at Fort Sill, Oklahoma from August to October 1918.

In October 1918, Smith was promoted to temporary brigadier general and assigned to command the 95th Division. He led the division during its organization and training at Camp Sherman, Ohio. The Armistice of November 11, 1918 ended the war before the 95th Division completed its training, and Smith remained in command until it was inactivated in December 1918. After the war, Smith performed recruiting duty in Columbus, Ohio, and he reverted to the permanent rank of lieutenant colonel in February 1919. In August 1919 he was assigned to the War Plans Division on the War Department General Staff. In July 1920, he was promoted to the permanent rank of colonel.

From September 1920 to September 1921 he served in the office of the deputy chief of staff for Intelligence (G-2). He served in the Regulations Branch of the Personnel Division until July 1924. He was then posted to Fort Thomas, Kentucky, where he served as chief of staff for Fifth Corps Area until November 1924. From November 1924 to September 1925, Smith was assigned to assist with organizing and training the 83rd Division, an Ohio-based unit of the Organized Reserve Corps. From September 1925 to 1928, he was Fifth Corps Area's liaison officer to the Organized Reserve Corps.

In April 1928, Smith was posted to Panama, where he served as commander of the Panama Pacific General Depot. After returning to the United States, he was assigned as Ninth Corps Area liaison officer to the Organized Reserve Corps. He remained in this post until retiring.

== Retirement and death ==
Smith left the army upon reaching the mandatory retirement age of 64 in March 1932. In 1930, the U.S. Congress enacted legislation permitting the general officers of World War I to retire at their highest wartime rank, and Smith was promoted to brigadier general on the retired list. In retirement, he was a resident of Beverly Hills, California. Smith died in Beverly Hills on March 11, 1941. He was buried at Arlington National Cemetery.

== Family ==
In 1907, Smith married Celeste Yeteve Pickering, the daughter of Colonel Abner Pickering. They were the parents of four children— Mauree Celeste, James Pickering, Catherine Yeteve, and Matthew Comerford. Mauree Smith was a longtime employee of the Southern California Automobile Club. James Smith was an army veteran of World War II and the Korean War and a longtime employee of a California freight service. Catherine Smith was a U.S. Marine Corps Women's Reserve veteran of World War II and career employee of the U.S. government. Matthew Comerford Smith was a career U.S. Army officer who served in World War II and the Korean War and retired as a colonel.
