= 309th Cavalry Regiment =

Army cavalry unit from 1918 to 1942

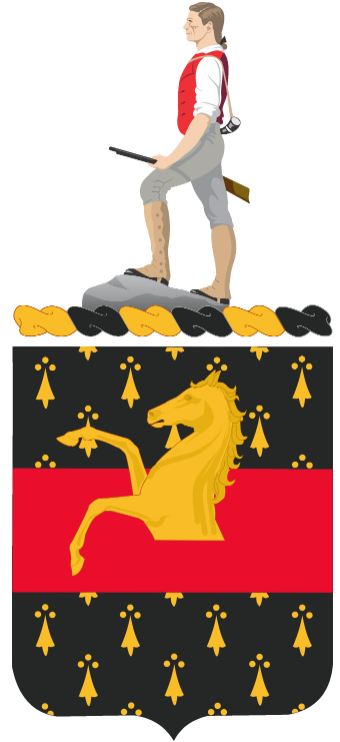
- Coat of Arms of the 309th Cavalry Regiment
- Active: February–August 1918; 1922–1942
- Country: United States
- Branch: United States Army
- Type: Cavalry
- Part of: 63rd Cavalry Division (1921–1942)
- Garrison/HQ: Atlanta (1934–1942)
- Motto: "Anima Fortuna Sequitur" (Fortune Follows Courage)

Insignia
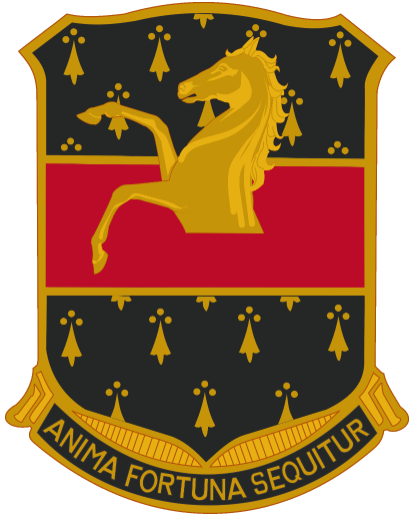
- Distinctive Unit Insignia

The 309th Cavalry Regiment was a cavalry unit of the United States Army during World War I and the interwar period. It was activated in early 1918 but broken up in the middle of the year to form new artillery units. The unit was recreated as a North Carolina Organized Reserve unit during the interwar period, and later moved to Georgia in the early 1930s. It was converted into a signal aircraft warning regiment after the United States entered World War II.

== History ==
Shortly after the United States entered World War I, the regiment was constituted in the National Army on 18 May 1917, and organized on 18 February 1918 at Fort Sam Houston. However, it was broken up on 18 August and its men were used to create the 56th and 57th Field Artillery Regiments, and the 19th Trench Mortar Battery. All three artillery units were demobilized at Fort Sill in February 1919: the 56th Field Artillery on 7 February, the 57th Field Artillery on 10 February, and the 19th Trench Mortar Battery on 12 February.

On 15 October 1921, the 56th and 57th Field Artillery and the 19th Trench Mortar Battery were reconstituted in the Organized Reserve as the 309th Cavalry Regiment, part of the 63rd Cavalry Division in the Fourth Corps Area. The 309th was initiated (activated) on 29 April 1922 with regimental headquarters at Asheville, 1st Squadron at Charlotte, and 2nd Squadron at High Point. The regiment joined the division's 155th Cavalry Brigade. The regiment had only officers, non-commissioned officers, and rated specialists assigned, and in event of mobilization was to use draftees to fill out its enlisted ranks. In its early years it was made up of World War I veterans. It was reorganized on 1 July 1929 as a three-squadron regiment, and its headquarters was relocated to Atlanta on 1 March 1934. The entire regiment was simultaneously moved to northwest Georgia. For the 1938 Third Army maneuver, the regiment provided 23 officers to the 108th Cavalry Regiment and 12 officers to the 109th Cavalry Regiment.

The regiment conducted summer training at Fort Oglethorpe, Georgia, with the 6th Cavalry Regiment. As an alternate form of training, the 309th provided basic cavalry military instruction to civilians under the Citizens' Military Training Camp program at Fort Oglethorpe. Its designated mobilization training station was Fort Oglethorpe, and its primary ROTC feeder school was the University of Georgia.

After the United States entered World War II, it was converted into the 544th Signal Aircraft Warning Regiment on 30 January 1942. The regiment was disbanded on 11 November 1944. An unrelated reserve unit, the 309th Armored Cavalry Regiment, briefly existed after the war in Michigan.

== Commanders ==
The 309th was commanded by the following officers:

- Colonel Mathew C. Smith (21 February–17 August 1918)
- Colonel Warren A. Fair (29 April 1922–December 1929)
- Lieutenant Colonel John W. Moore (26 April 1930–2 August 1934)
- Colonel Harold D. Coate (2 August 1934–25 January 1936)
- Colonel Alexander G. Conoley (25 January 1936–May 1940)

== Heraldry ==
The 309th's coat of arms and distinctive unit insignia were approved on 23 April 1928. The distinctive unit insignia was amended to add the motto on 22 January 1936. The distinctive unit insignia included a 1 1/8 in (2.86 cm) gold colored metal and enamel device, which consisted of a pean shield with a red stripe in the center, and a horse rampant over the top half of the shield. The yellow horse symbolized the cavalry and the red stripe represented its artillery service. The regimental motto, "Anima Fortuna Sequitur" (Fortune Follows Courage), was attached to the bottom of the distinctive unit insignia. The regimental coat of arms was of a similar design to the distinctive unit insignia but included the Organized Reserve's Minuteman crest above the shield and omitted the motto.
