= NGC 309 =

Spiral galaxy located in the constellation Cetus

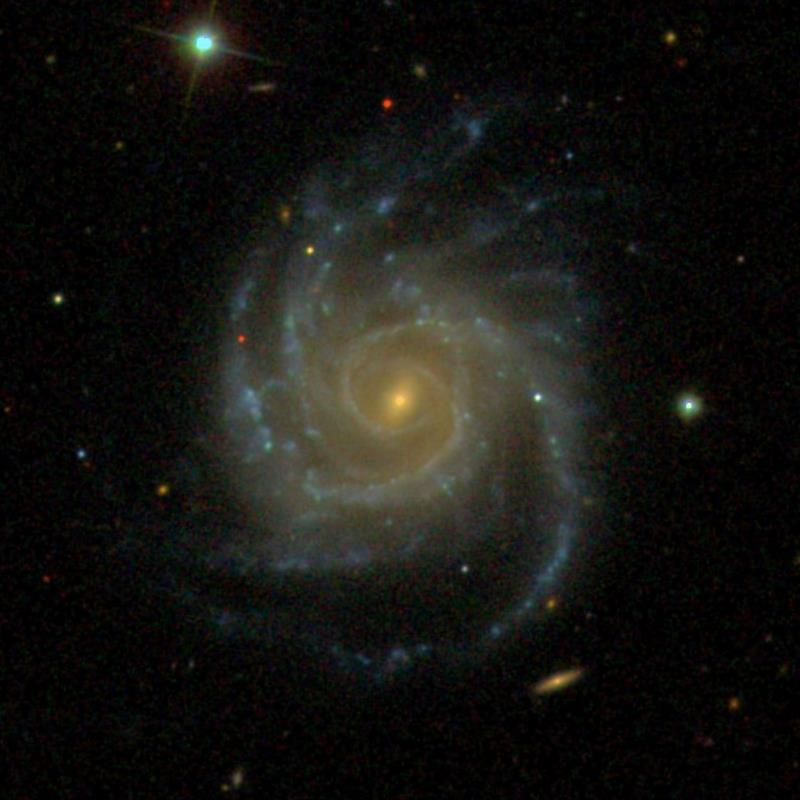
- SDSS image of NGC 309

Observation data (J2000 epoch)
- Constellation: Cetus
- Right ascension: 00^{h} 56^{m} 42.653^{s}
- Declination: −09° 54′ 49.883″
- Redshift: 0.018883
- Heliocentric radial velocity: 5661 ± 2 km/s
- Distance: 87.99 ± 10.45 Mly (26.978 ± 3.205 Mpc)
- Apparent magnitude (V): 13.4g

Characteristics
- Type: SAB(r)c
- Size: ~80,900 ly (24.81 kpc) (estimated)
- Apparent size (V): 1.94′ × 1.34′

Other designations
- HOLM 027A, IRAS 00542-1010, 2MASX J00564266-0954500, MCG -02-03-050, PGC 3377

NGC 309 is a spiral galaxy in the constellation Cetus. Its velocity with respect to the cosmic microwave background is 5343 ± 22 km/s, which corresponds to a Hubble distance of 257.0 ± 18.0 Mly (78.81 ± 5.53 Mpc). However, nine non-redshift measurements give a much closer distance of 87.99 ± 10.45 Mly (26.978 ± 3.205 Mpc). It was discovered in 1876 by Wilhelm Tempel.

NGC 309 and NGC 309A are listed together as Holm 27 in Erik Holmberg's A Study of Double and Multiple Galaxies Together with Inquiries into some General Metagalactic Problems, published in 1937.

== Supernovae ==
Five supernovae have been observed in NGC 309.

Supernovae in NGC 309
Supernova	apmag	type	Discovery date
1999ge	15.5	II	27 November 1999
2008cx	17.8	IIb	5 June 2008
2012dt	18.0	IIP	17 July 2012
PSN J00564446-0954595	17.2	IIb	10 June 2013
2014ef	17.3	Ib	13 December 2014

== See also ==
- List of NGC objects (1–1000)
