= 309th Armored Cavalry Regiment =

- Active: 1949–1950
- Country: United States
- Branch: United States Army
- Type: Cavalry
- Role: Reconnaissance
- Garrison/HQ: Lansing

The 309th Armored Cavalry Regiment (309th ACR) was a Michigan-based reconnaissance unit of the United States Army Organized Reserve Corps, which briefly existed after World War II.

== History ==
The 309th Armored Cavalry was constituted on 21 October 1948 in the Organized Reserve Corps, and partially organized from existing units on 19 July 1949. Its headquarters and headquarters company (HHC) was redesignated from the headquarters and headquarters troop of the 309th Cavalry Group, Mechanized, which had been constituted on 19 November 1946 in the Organized Reserve and activated on 29 November of that year in Lansing. In May 1947, the group was commanded by Colonel Frank S. Pritchard.

The HHC was inactivated on 4 December 1950 at Lansing, and the regiment was disbanded on 10 March 1952. The 309th ACR did not inherit the lineage of the prewar 309th Cavalry Regiment, and was not authorized a coat of arms or distinctive unit insignia.
