= Camp Sherman (Ohio) =

US Army National Guard training center

Camp Sherman Joint Training Center
- Chillicothe, Ohio
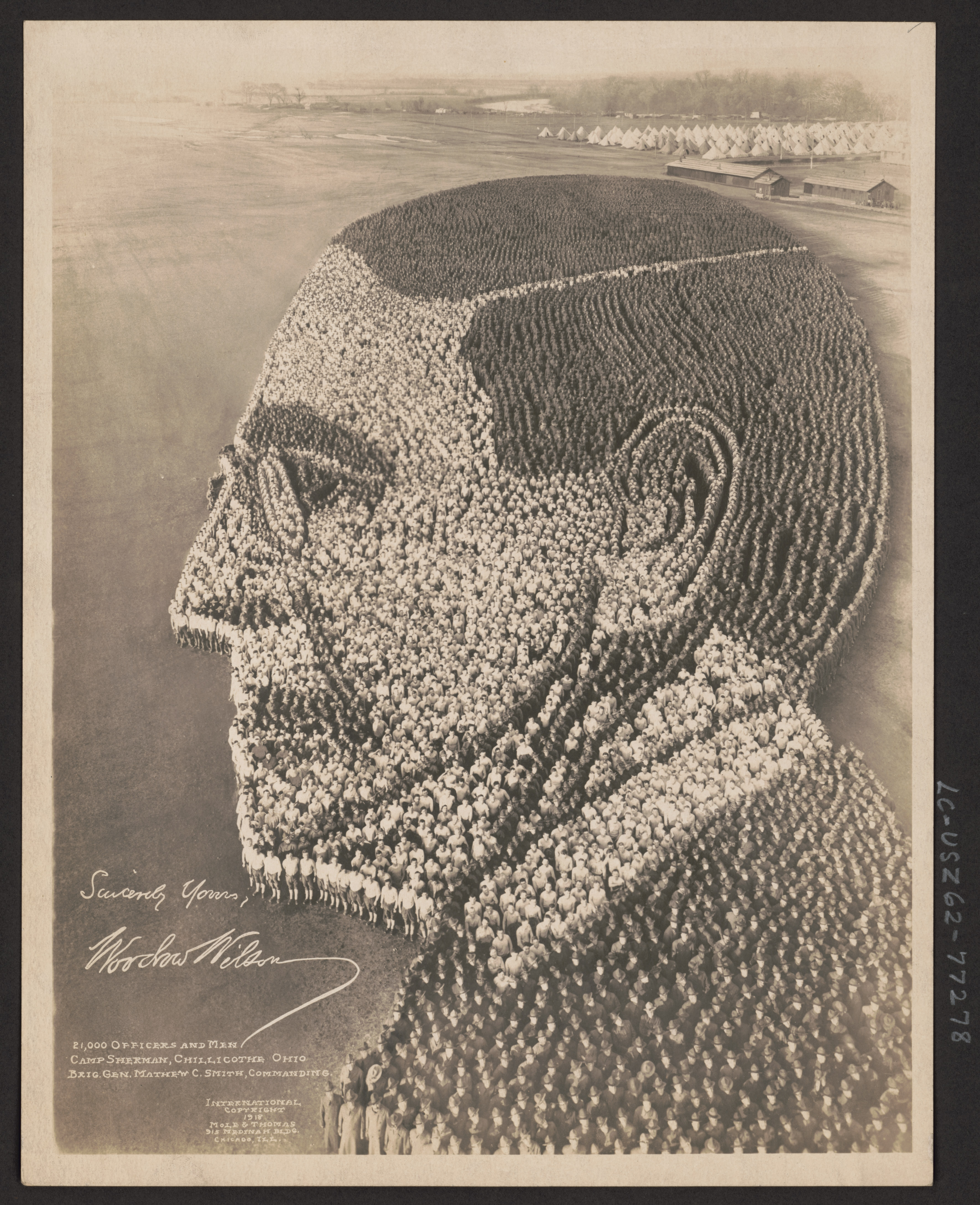
- Portrait of President Woodrow Wilson formed by 21,000 military officers and men at Camp Sherman in 1918

Site information
- Type: Military Base
- Owner: Ohio Army National Guard

Location
- Coordinates: 39°22′05″N 83°00′03″W

Site history
- Built: 1917

Camp Sherman is an American military training site near Chillicothe, Ohio. It was established in 1917 after the United States entered World War I. It now serves as a training site for the Ohio Army National Guard.

== History ==
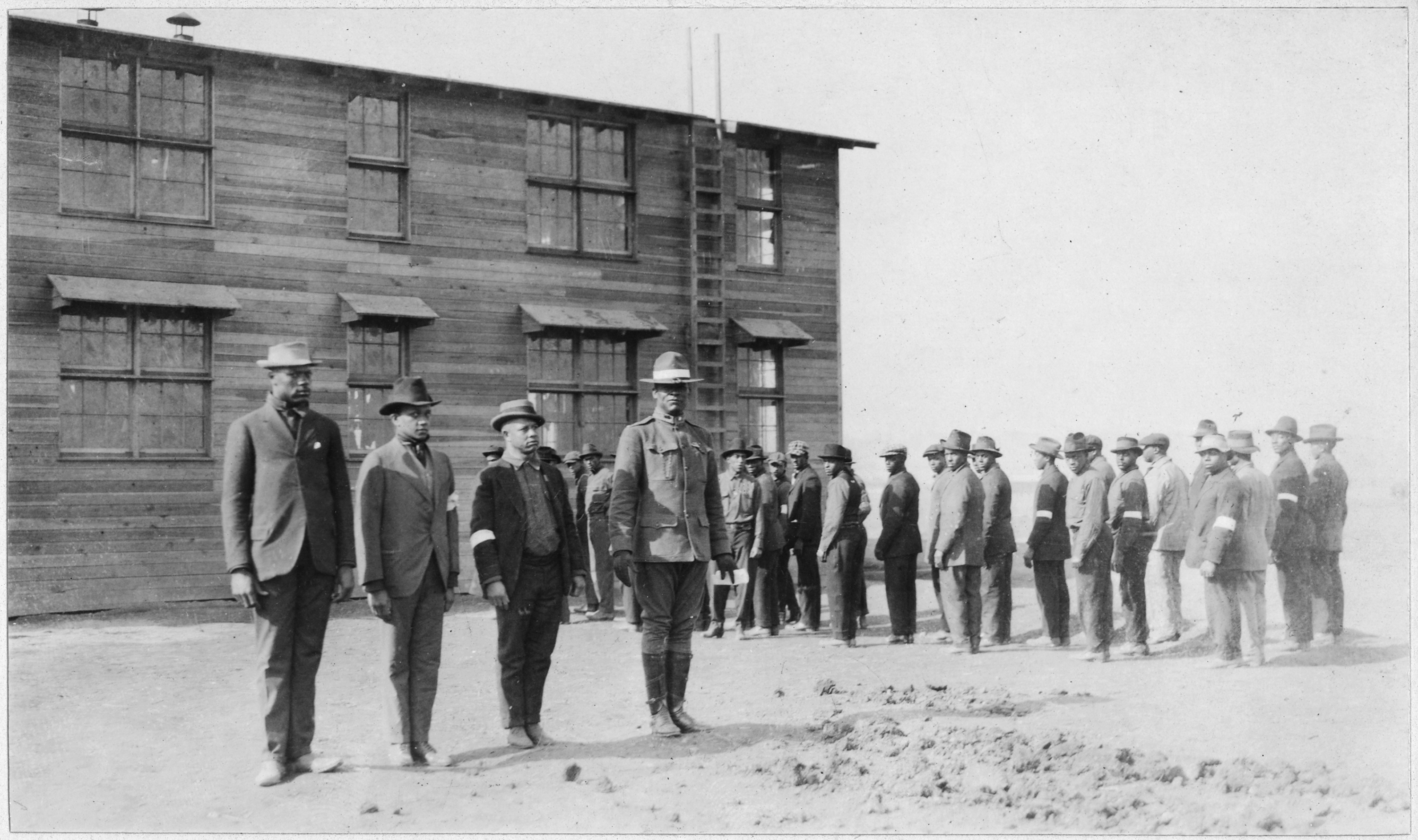
Buffalo Soldiers at Camp Sherman

Between June and September 1917, the United States Army constructed more than 1,300 buildings at the Camp Sherman site; over 40,000 soldiers passed through the facility during World War I. The garrison included the 158th Depot Brigade, which was commanded for part of the war by Brigadier general Tyree R. Rivers. (Note: Depot brigades located at several posts throughout the United States were responsible during the war for receiving, equipping, and training recruits prior to their departure for the front lines. After the war, depot brigades carried out demobilization activities for returning soldiers prior to discharging them.)

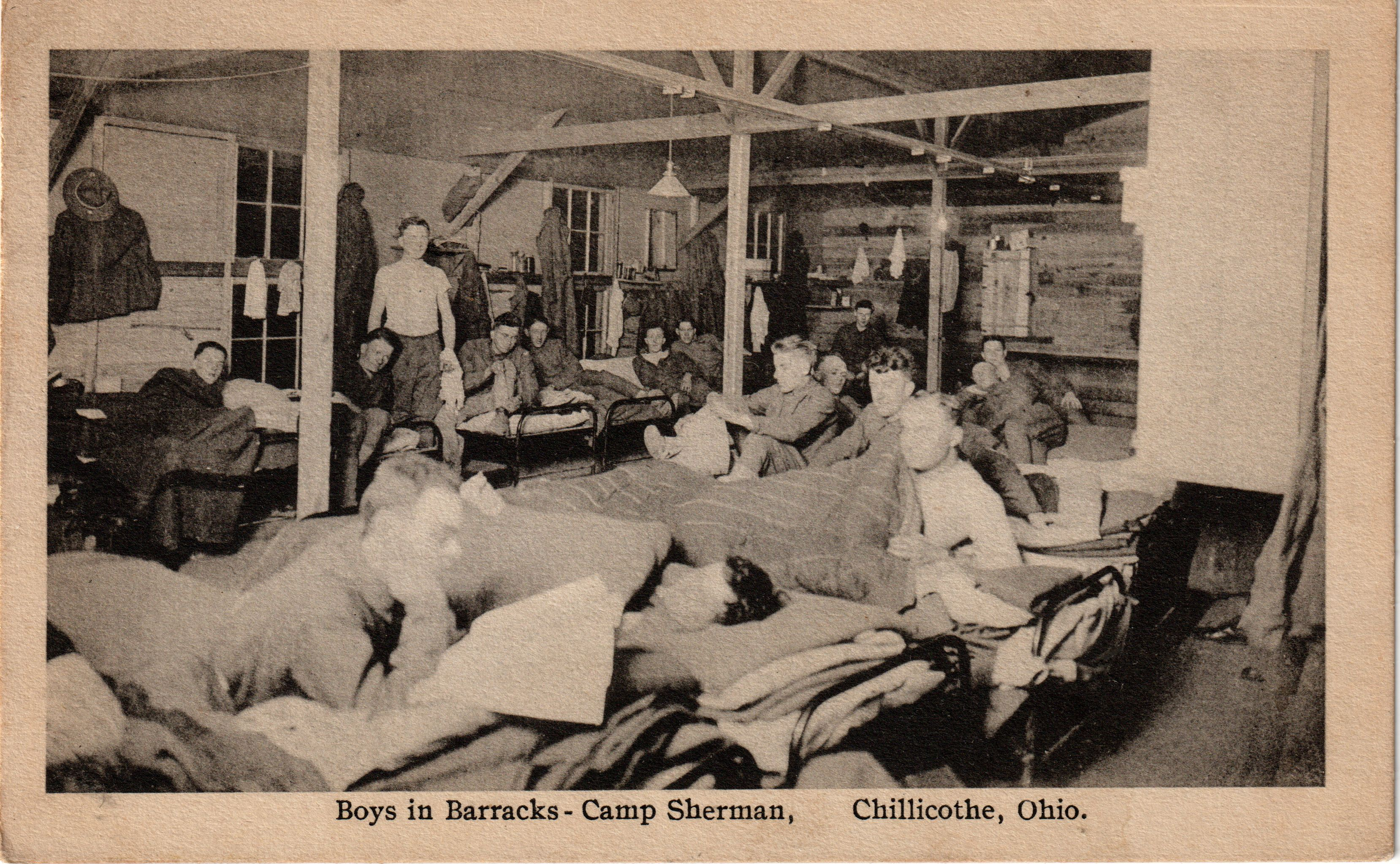
US Army soldiers in barracks at Camp Sherman, about 1918

Soldiers trained at Camp Sherman during World War I included the 95th Division, which was commanded by Brigadier General Mathew C. Smith. Construction work affected "Mound City Group", an enclosure and collection of earthworks left by the native Hopewell culture, as some ancient earthworks were damaged or destroyed.

The 1918 flu pandemic, colloquially known as the Spanish flu, affected over 5,500 soldiers at Camp Sherman, resulting in over 1,700 deaths.

In 2009, the remaining National Guard facility was renamed Camp Sherman Joint Training Center.

Unioto High School, which serves Union Township and Scioto Township, is located on former grounds of Camp Sherman.
