= 309th =

309th may refer to:

- 309th Aerospace Maintenance and Regeneration Group, a United States Air Force storage and maintenance facility in Tucson, Arizona
- 309th Air Division, inactive United States Air Force organization
- 309th Airlift Squadron, part of the 86th Airlift Wing at Chièvres Air Base, Belgium
- 309th Bombardment Squadron or 525th Fighter Squadron, United States Air Force unit
- 309th Fighter Squadron (309 FS), part of the 56th Operations Group at Luke Air Force Base, Arizona
- 309th Maintenance Wing, inactive wing of the United States Air Force last based at Hill Air Force Base, Utah
- 309th Military Intelligence Battalion (United States) conducts initial entry, collective, and functional training
- 309th Rifle Division (Soviet Union), formed for the first time as a standard Red Army rifle division shortly after the German invasion

== See also ==
- 309 (number)
- 309, the year 309 (CCCIX) of the Julian calendar
- 309 BC
