= Armorial of the United States Army =

Military coats of arms

Coats of arms of US Army units are heraldic emblems associated with units in the US Army. Under Army Regulation 840-10, each regiment and separate table of organization and equipment (TOE) battalion of the US Army is authorized a coat of arms to be displayed on the organization's flag, called the "colors." This coat of arms usually forms the basis for the unit's distinctive unit insignia (DUI), the emblem worn by all members of the unit on their service uniforms.

Below are galleries of the coats of arms of US Army units. The official mottoes (as awarded by The Institute of Heraldry of the U.S. Army) and/or special designations (as awarded by the United States Army Center of Military History) of the units are also noted.

== Adjutant General units ==
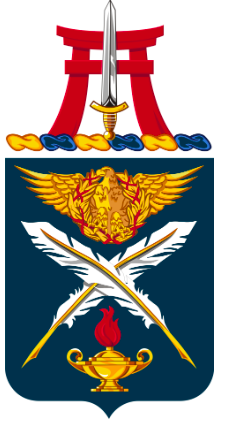
4th Adjutant General Battalion
"High Above the Rest"

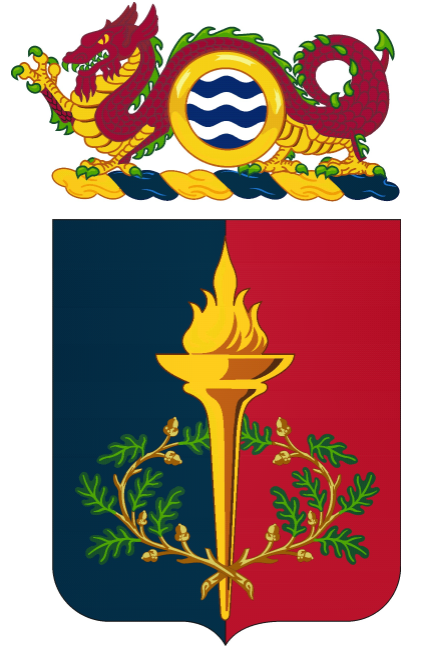
6th Adjutant General Battalion
"Train, Defend, Serve"

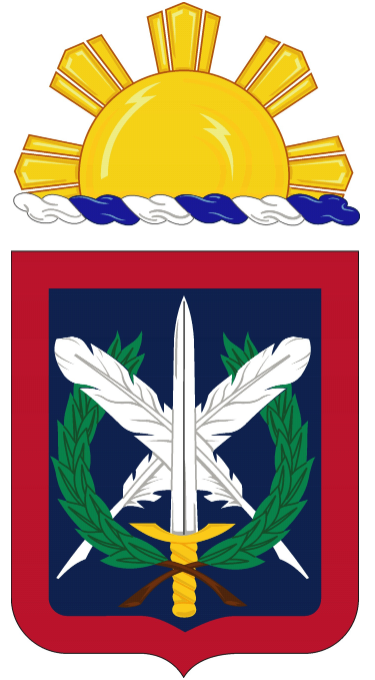
14th Adjutant General Battalion
"Victory through Excellence"

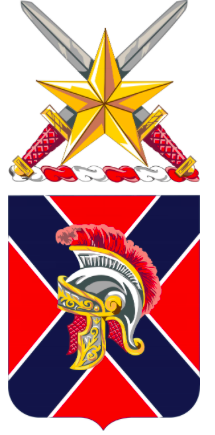
30th Adjutant General Battalion
"Meeting the Challenge"

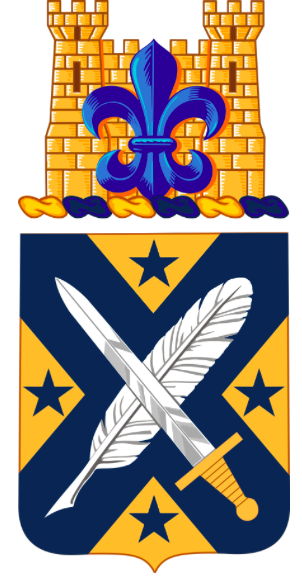
39th Adjutant General Battalion
"Excellence Starts Here"

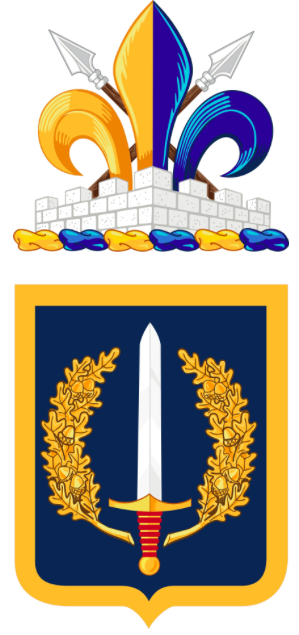
42nd Adjutant General Battalion
"Impellite Militem" (Start The Soldier)

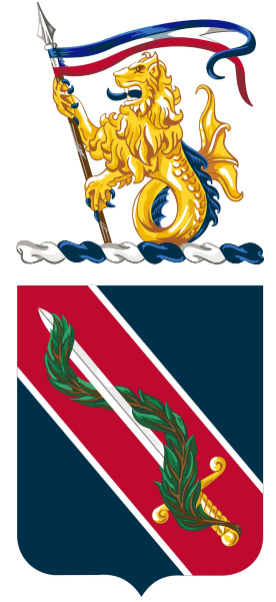
43rd Adjutant General Battalion
"Soldiers for Freedom"

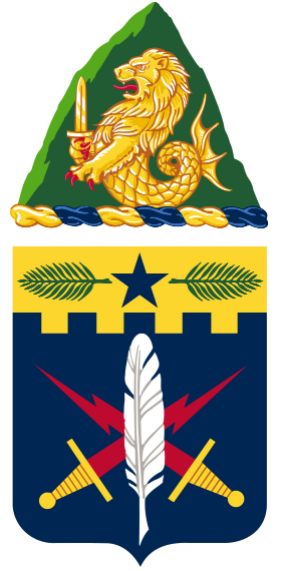
46th Adjutant General Battalion
"Begin with the Best"

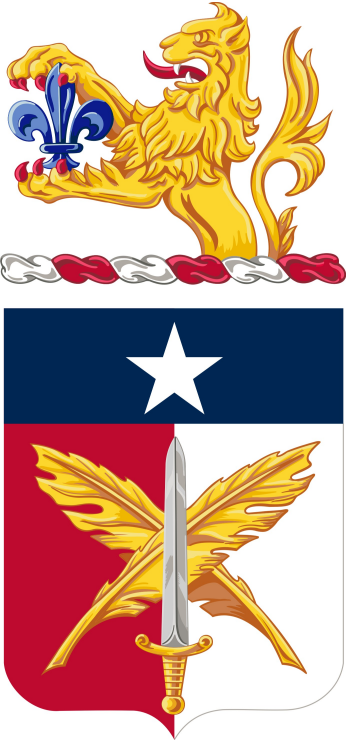
67th Adjutant General Battalion
"Prepared and Able"

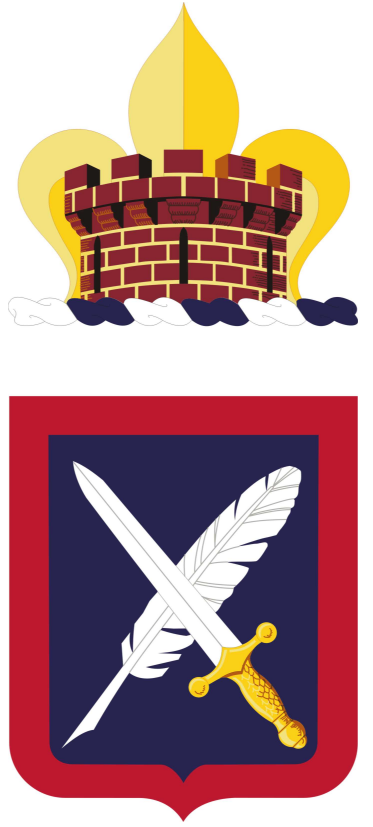
95th Adjutant General Battalion
"Soldiering Starts Here"

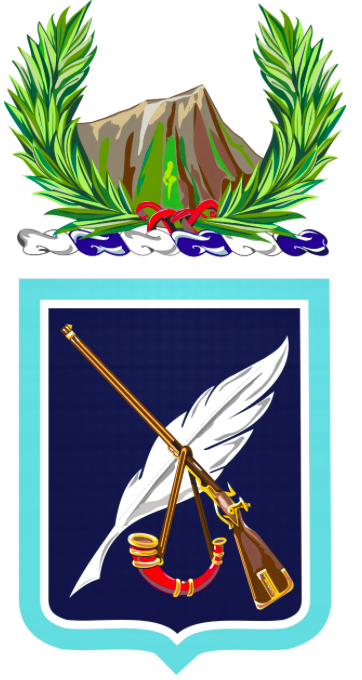
120th Adjutant General Battalion
"We Set the Example"

369th Adjutant General Battalion
"Army Pride"

== Air Defense Artillery units ==
=== 1 to 100 ===
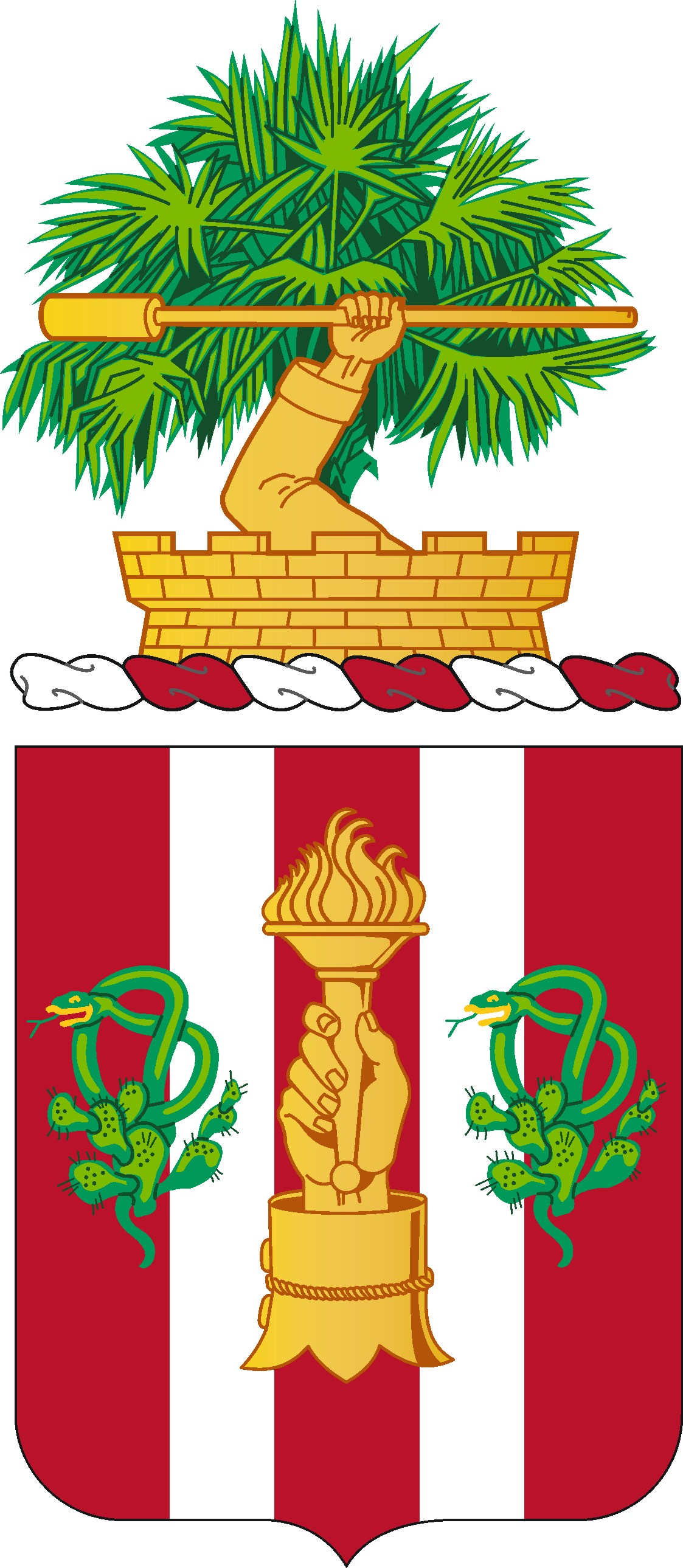
1st Air Defense Artillery
(formerly 1st Coast Artillery)
"Primus Inter Pares" (First Among Equals)

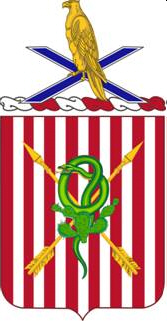
2nd Air Defense Artillery
(formerly 2nd Coast Artillery)
"Fidus Ultra Finem" (Faithful Beyond The End)

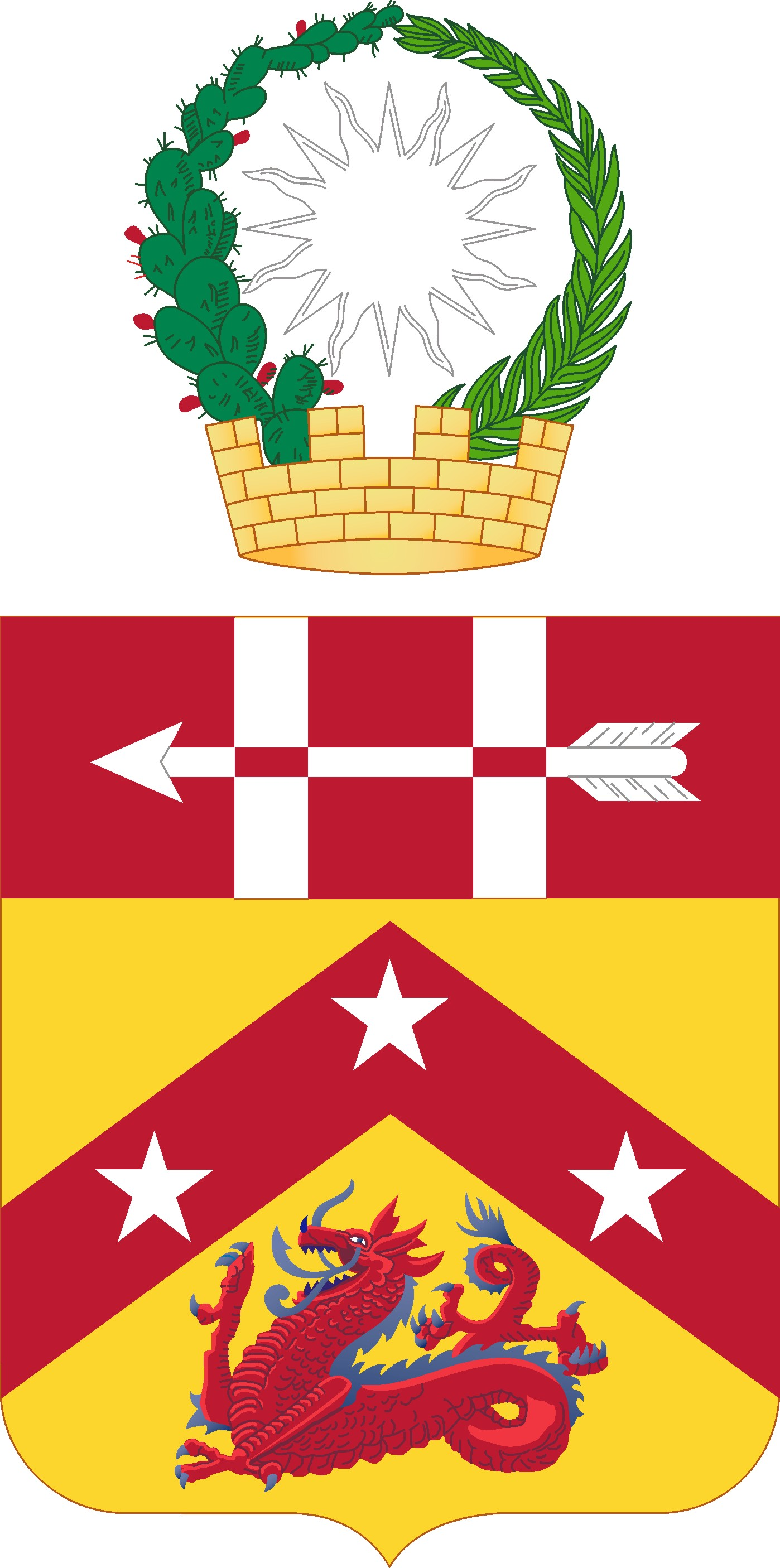
3rd Air Defense Artillery
(formerly 3rd Coast Artillery)
"Non Cedo Ferio" (I Yield not, I Strike)

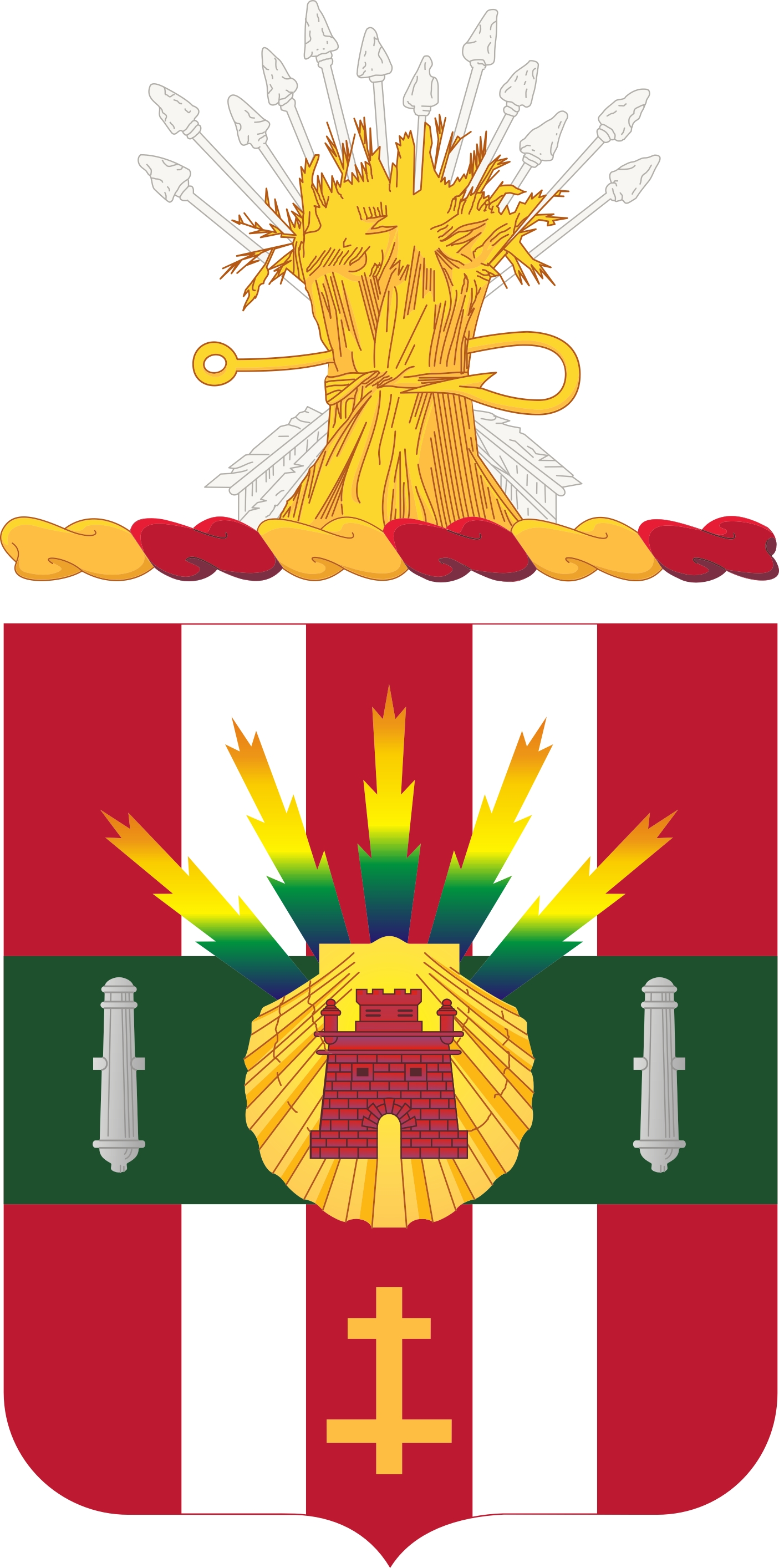
4th Air Defense Artillery
(formerly 4th Coast Artillery)
"Nulli Vestigia Retrorsum" (No Step Backward)

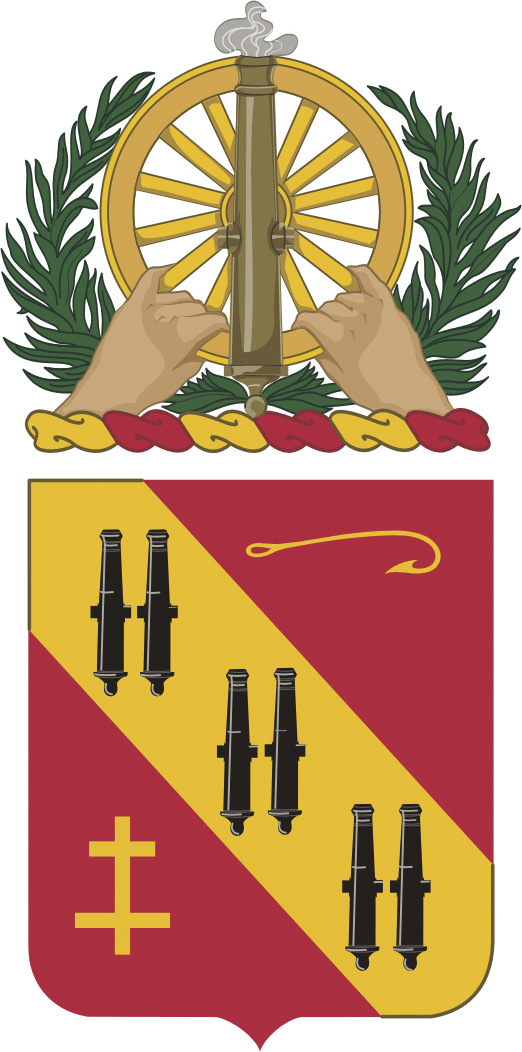
5th Air Defense Artillery
(formerly 5th Coast Artillery)
"Volens et Potens" (Willing and Able)

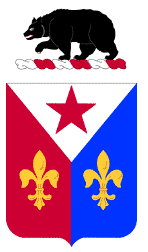
6th Air Defense Artillery
(formerly 6th Coast Artillery)
"Certo Dirigo Ictu" (I Aim With a Sure Blow)

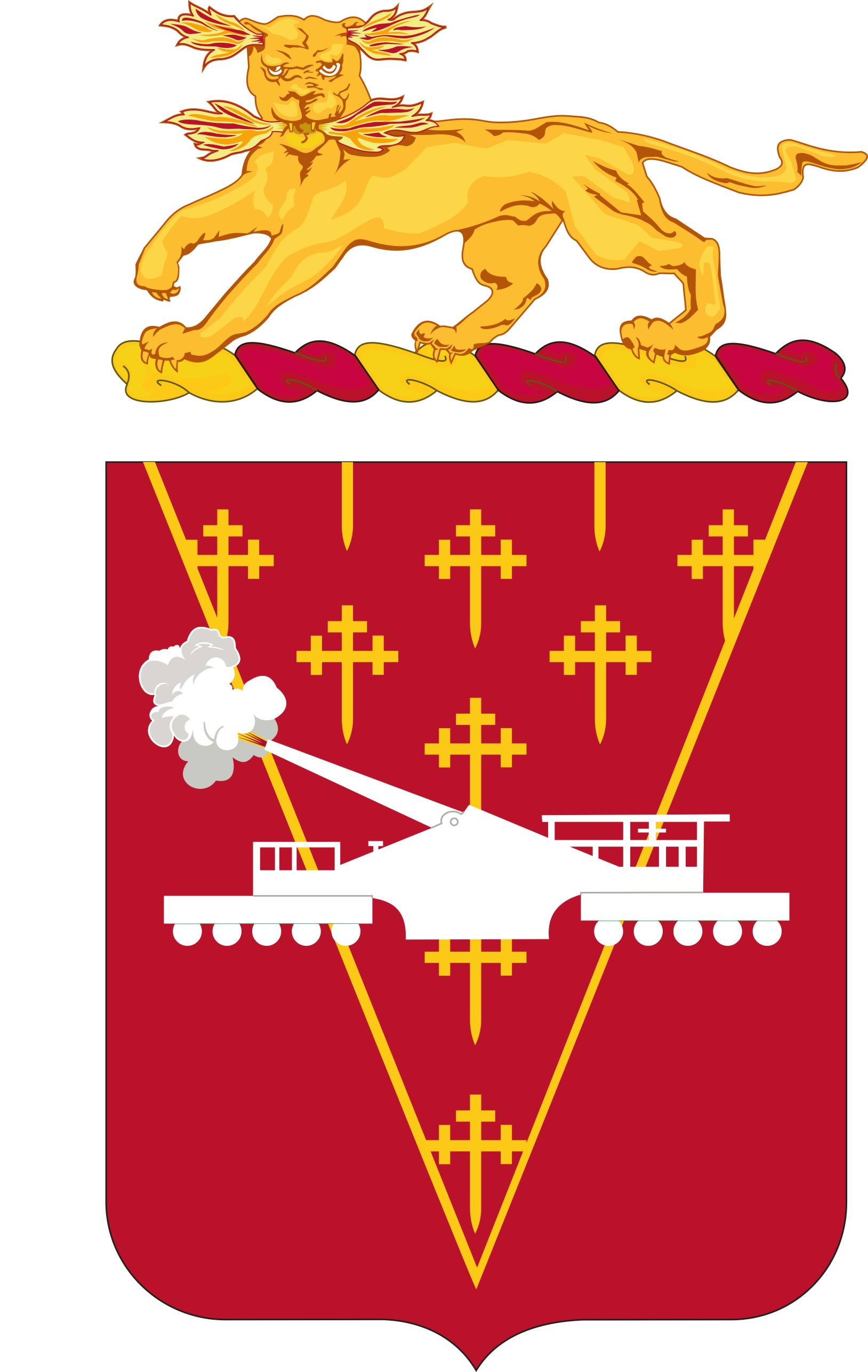
7th Air Defense Artillery
(formerly 7th Coast Artillery)
"Nullis Pavet Occursum" (He Fears No Encounter)

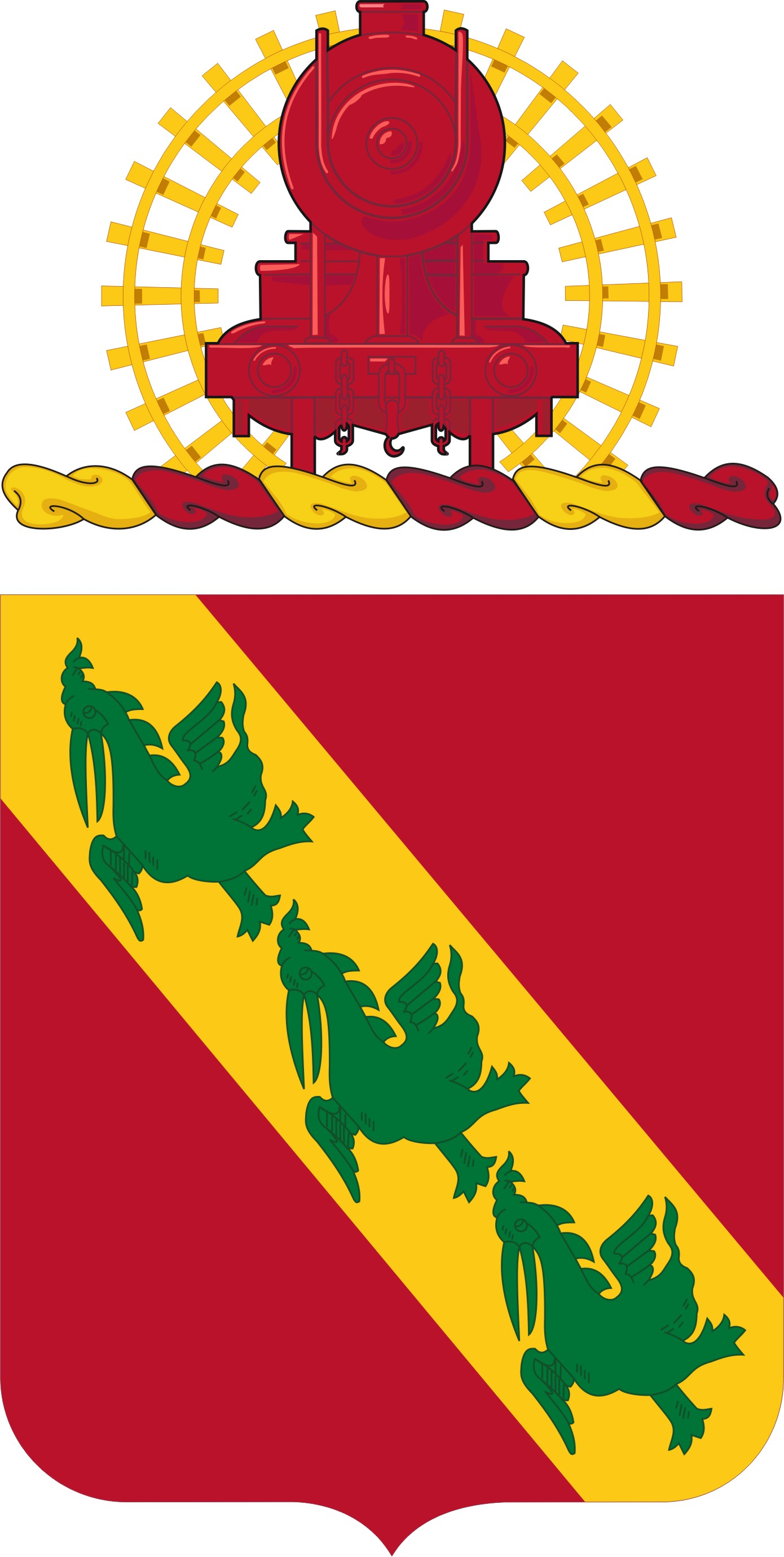
43rd Air Defense Artillery
(formerly 43rd Coast Artillery)
"Sustenemus" (We Support)

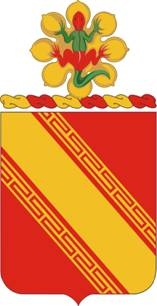
44th Air Defense Artillery
(formerly 44th Coast Artillery)
"Per Ardua" (Through Difficulties)

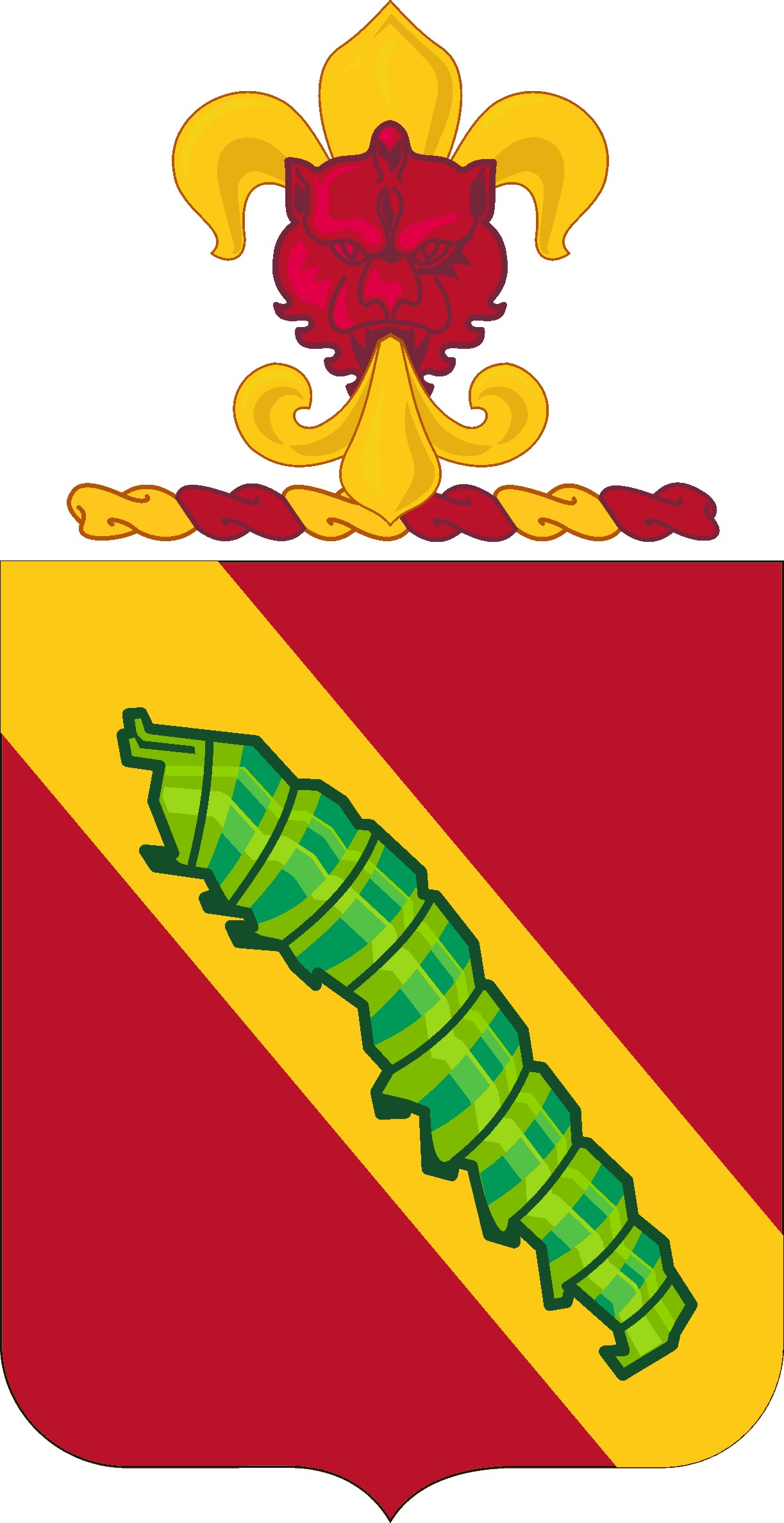
51st Air Defense Artillery
(formerly 51st Coast Artillery)
"Fire for Effect"

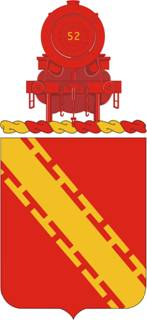
52d Air Defense Artillery
(formerly 52nd Coast Artillery)
"Semper Paratus" (Always Prepared)

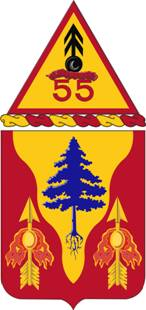
55th Air Defense Artillery
(formerly 55th Coast Artillery)
"Vigilantia" (Vigilance)

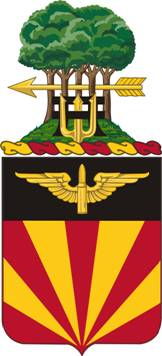
56th Air Defense Artillery
(formerly 56th Coast Artillery)
"Night Hides Not"

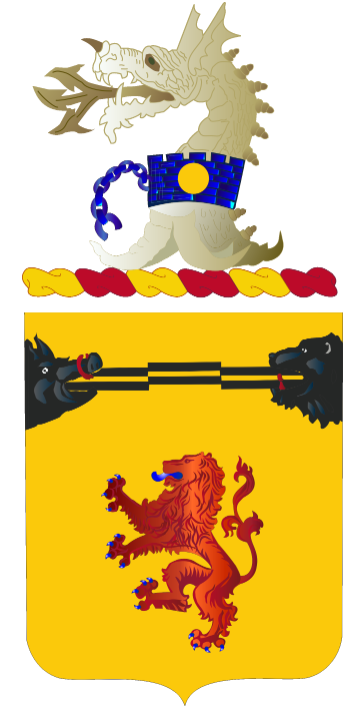
57th Air Defense Artillery
(formerly 57th Coast Artillery)
"Veto" (I Forbid)

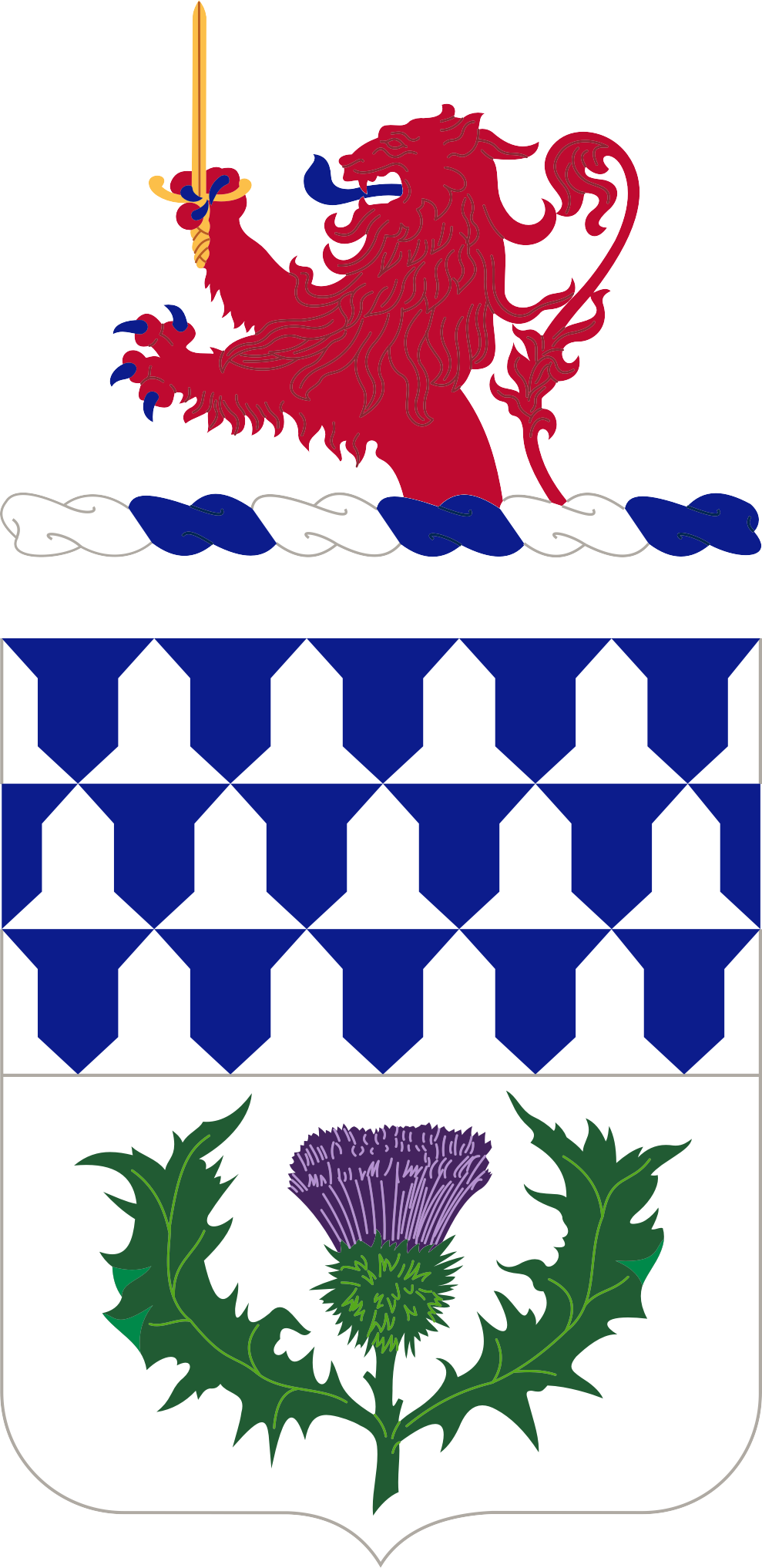
59th Air Defense Artillery
(formerly 59th Coast Artillery)
"Defendimus"

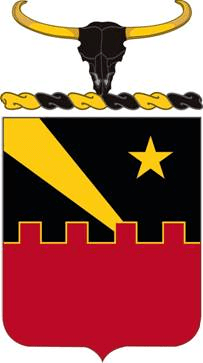
60th Air Defense Artillery
(formerly 60th Coast Artillery)
"Coelis Imperamus" (We Rule The Heavens)

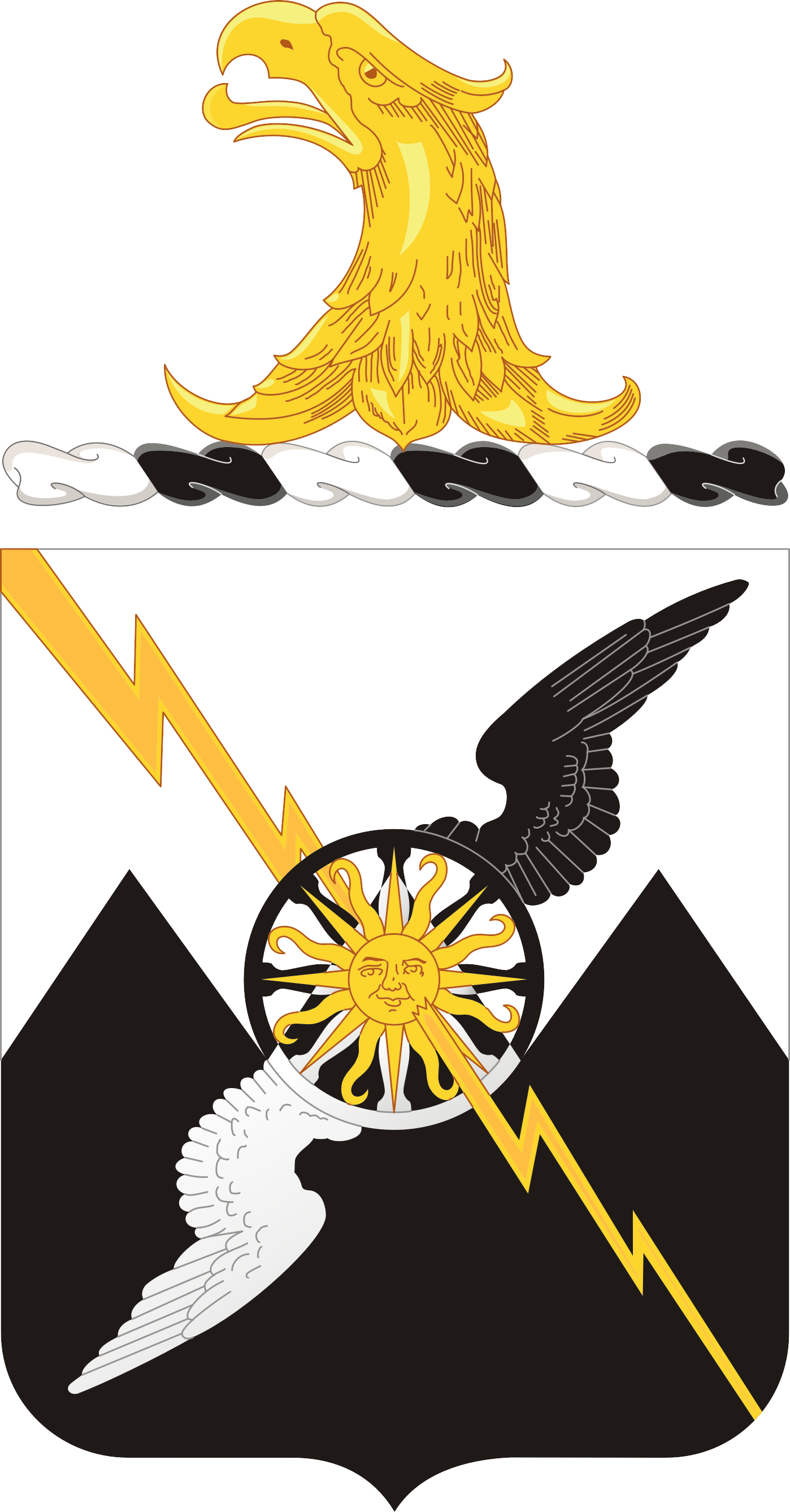
61st Air Defense Artillery
(formerly 61st Coast Artillery)
"Non Est Ad Astra Mollis e Terris Via" (The Way To the Stars Is Not Easy)

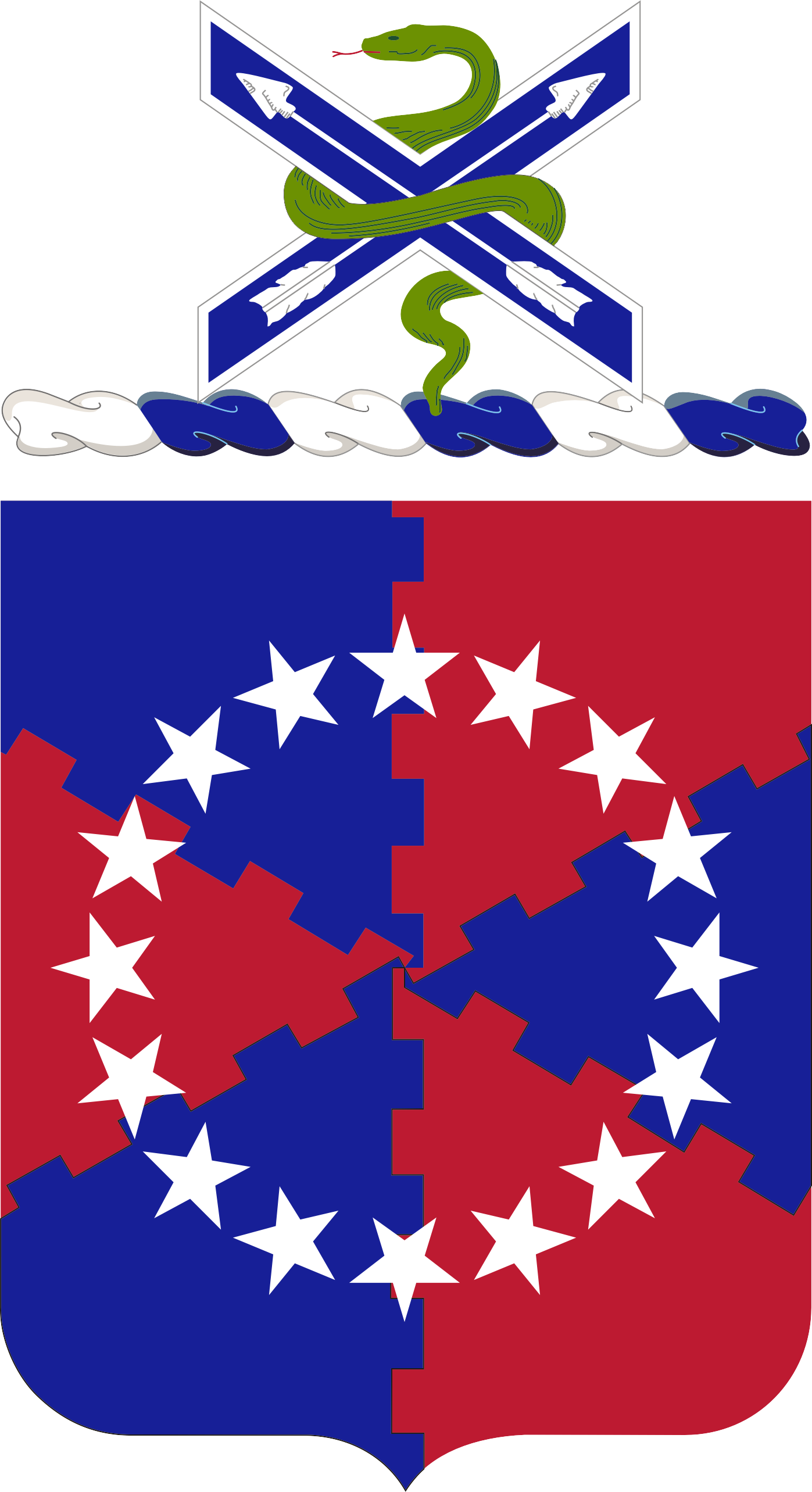
62nd Air Defense Artillery
(formerly 62nd Coast Artillery)
"Nitimur In Alta" (We Aim At High Things)

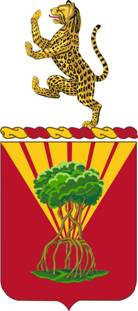
65th Air Defense Artillery
(formerly 65th Coast Artillery)
"Sursum" (Upwards)

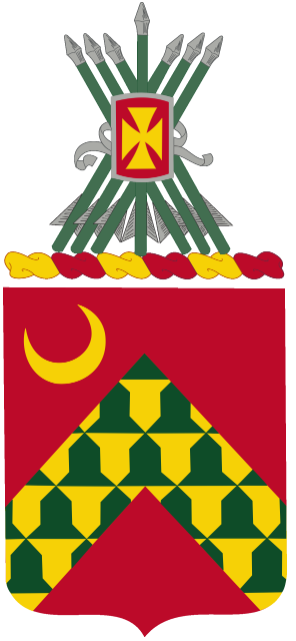
67th Air Defense Artillery
(formerly 67th Coast Artillery)
"Memor et Fidelis" (Mindful and Faithful)

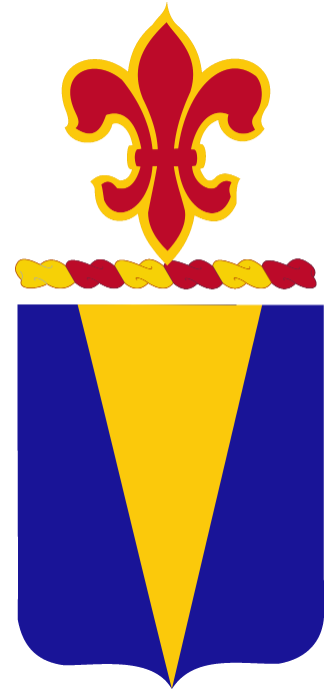
68th Air Defense Artillery
(formerly 68th Coast Artillery)
"Lolamy" (Can Do)

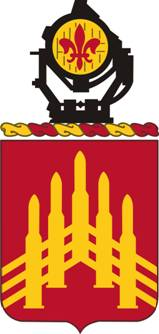
71st Air Defense Artillery
(formerly 71st Coast Artillery)
"Unidique Veniumus" (We Come From All Parts)

=== 101 on ===
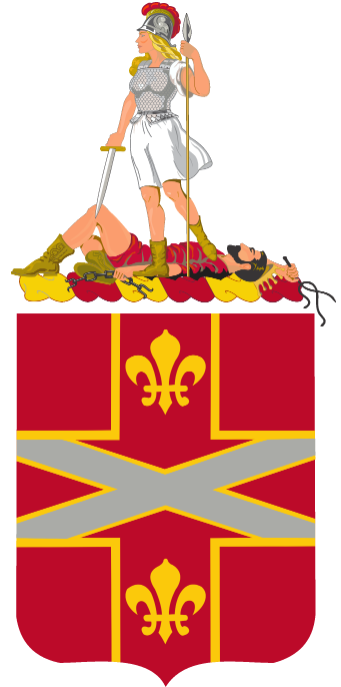
111th Air Defense Artillery
(formerly 111th Artillery)
"Glory and Honor"

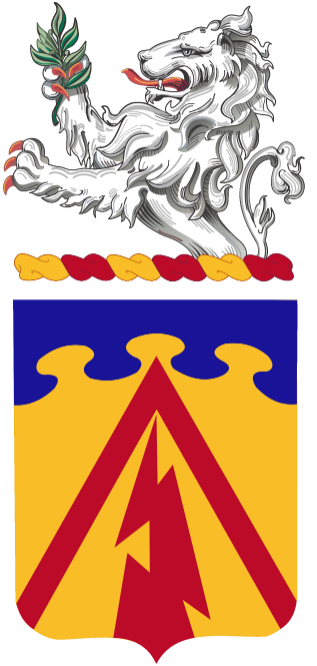
138th Air Defense Artillery
"Rising to the Defense"

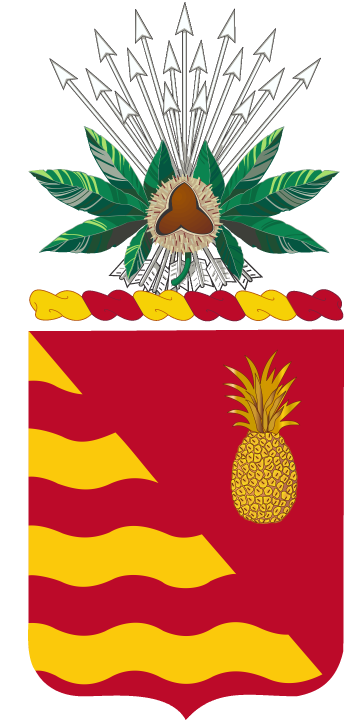
174th Air Defense Artillery
(formerly 174th Artillery)
"Caveat Oppugnator" (Let the Oppressor Beware)
"First Ohio"

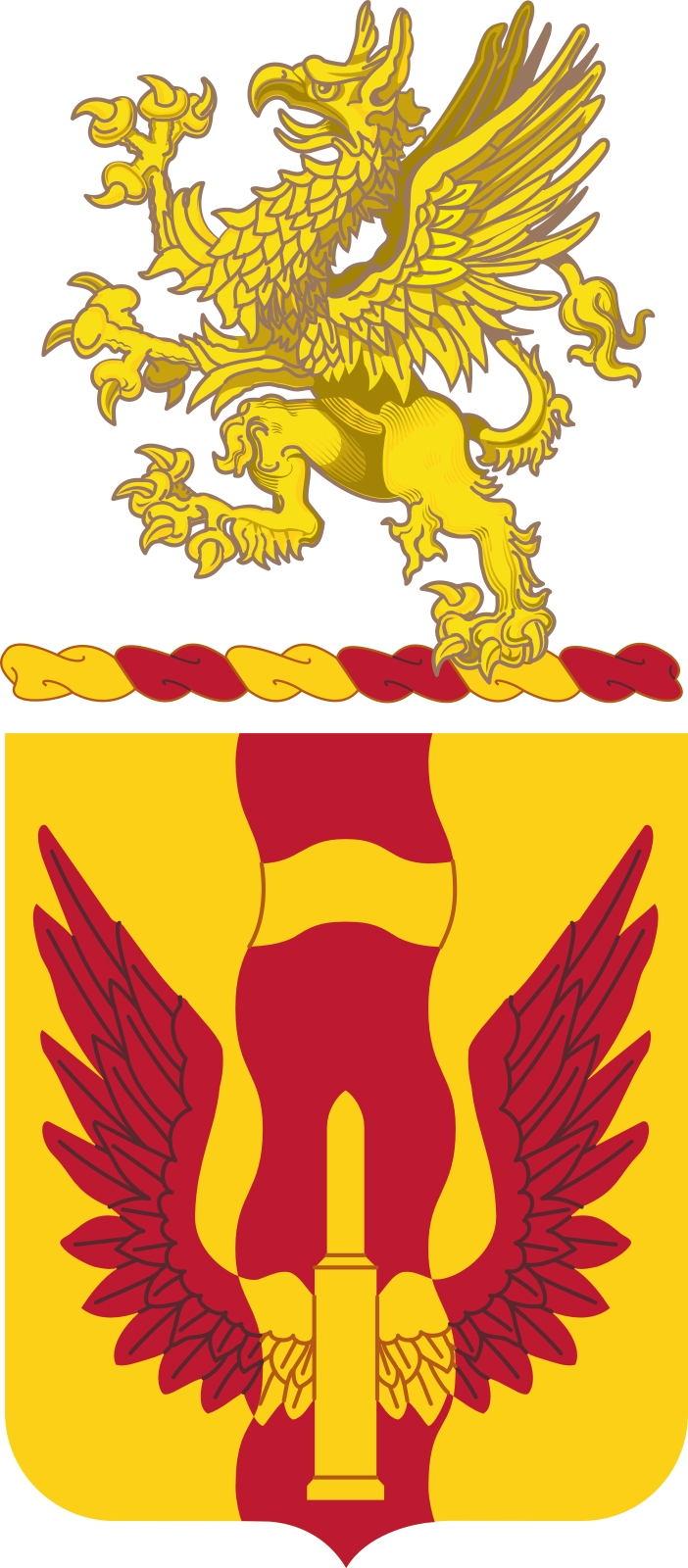
177th Air Defense Artillery
(formerly 177th Artillery)
"Vigilant and Prepared"

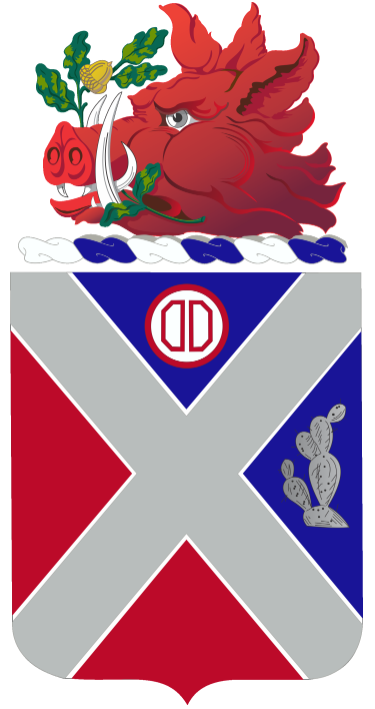
179th Air Defense Artillery
(formerly 179th Field Artillery & 179th Artillery)
"In Bello Paceque Primus" (First in War and Peace)

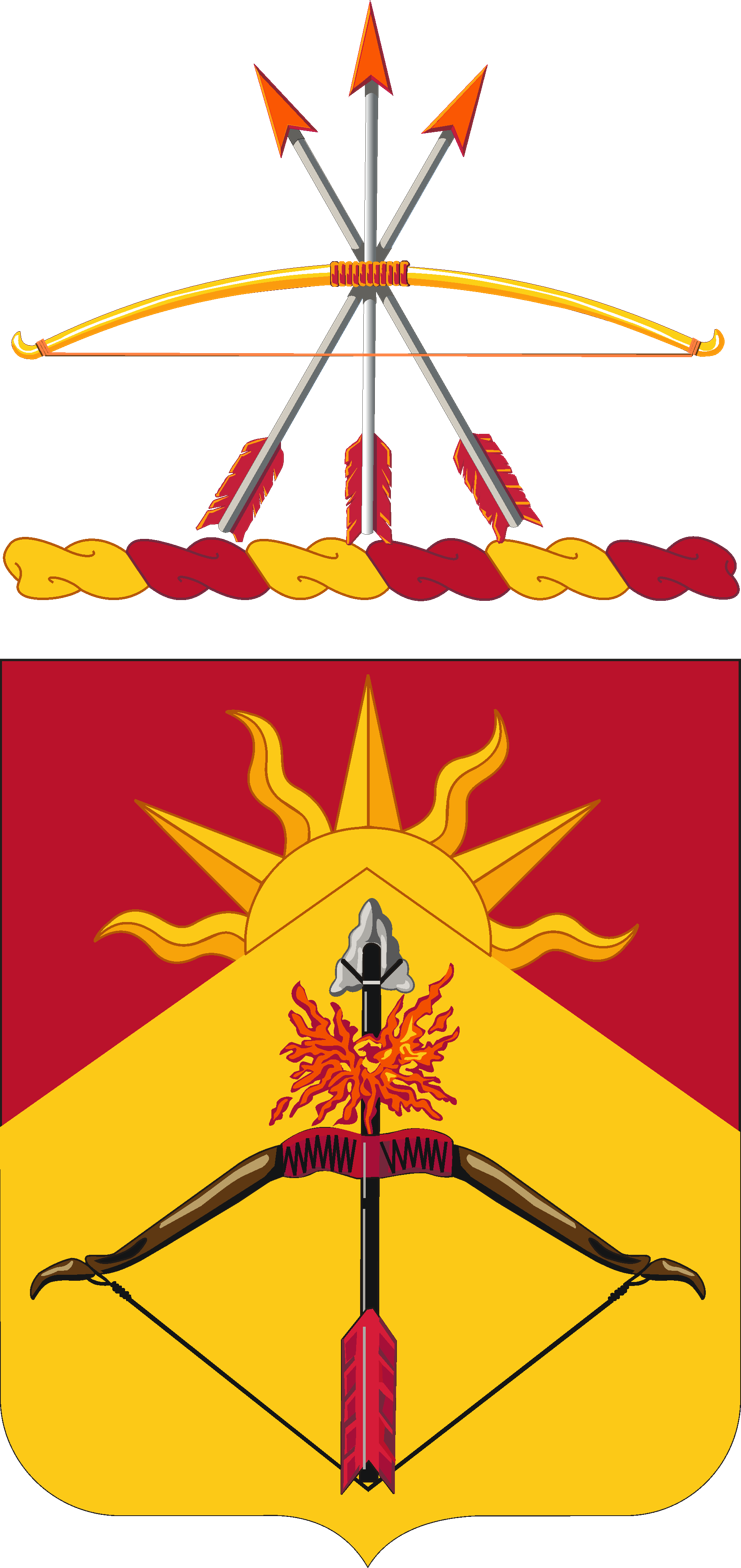
188th Air Defense Artillery
"Forever Vigilant"

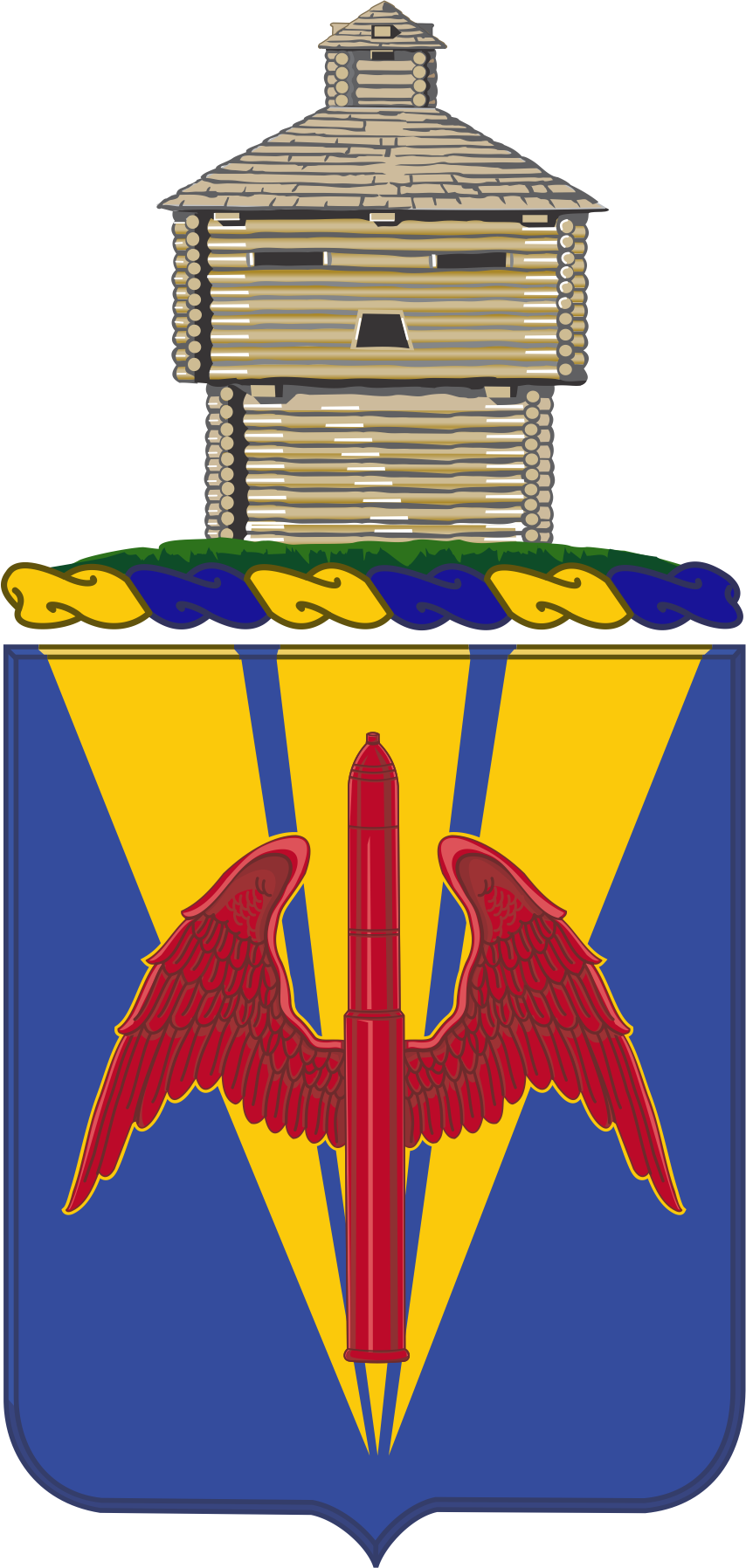
202nd Air Defense Artillery
(formerly 202nd Coast Artillery)
"Arte et armis" (By Skill and Arms)

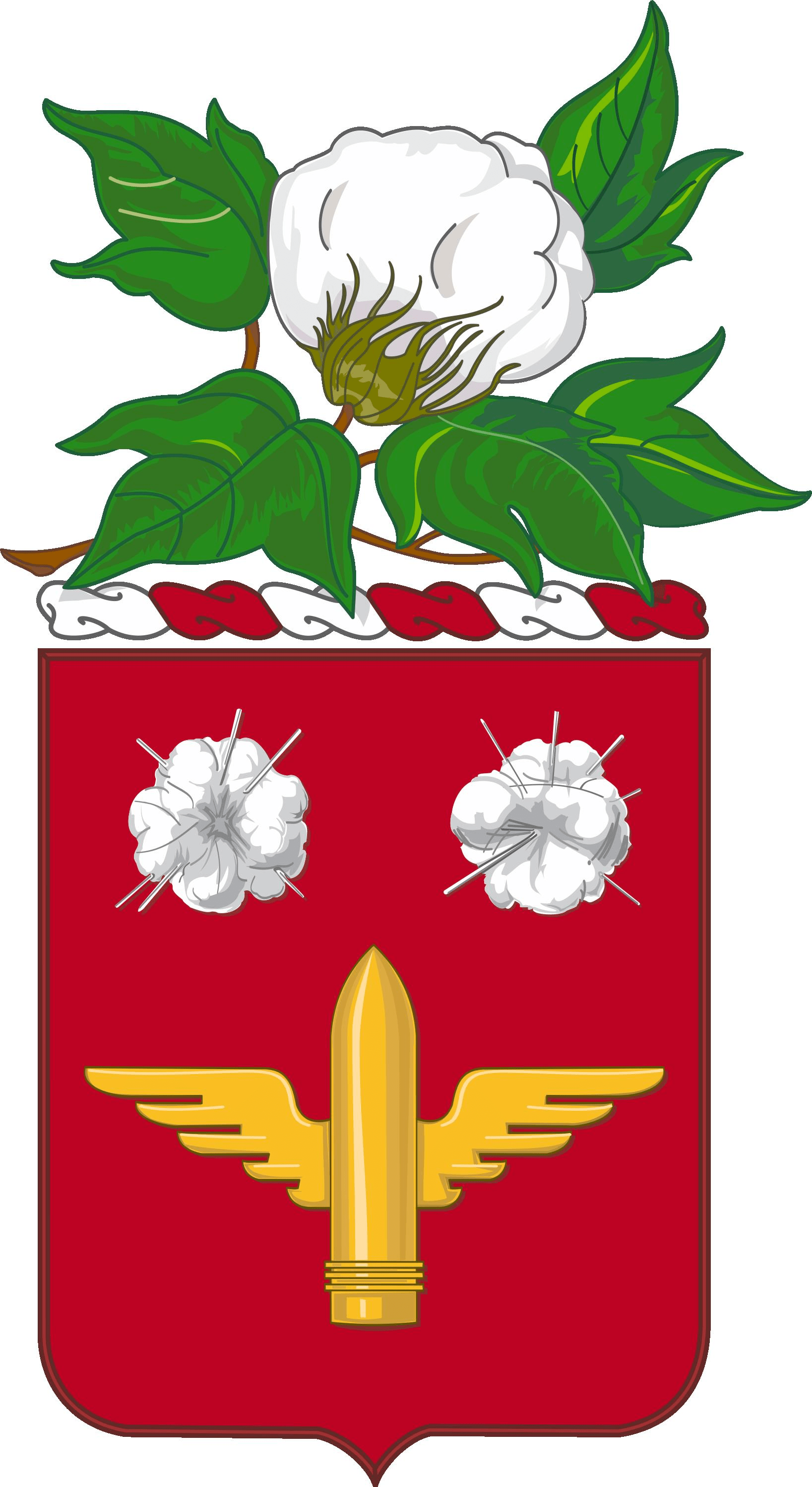
203rd Air Defense Artillery
"Duty Well Done"

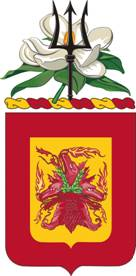
204th Air Defense Artillery
"Dum Viglio Paro" (While I Watch I Prepare)

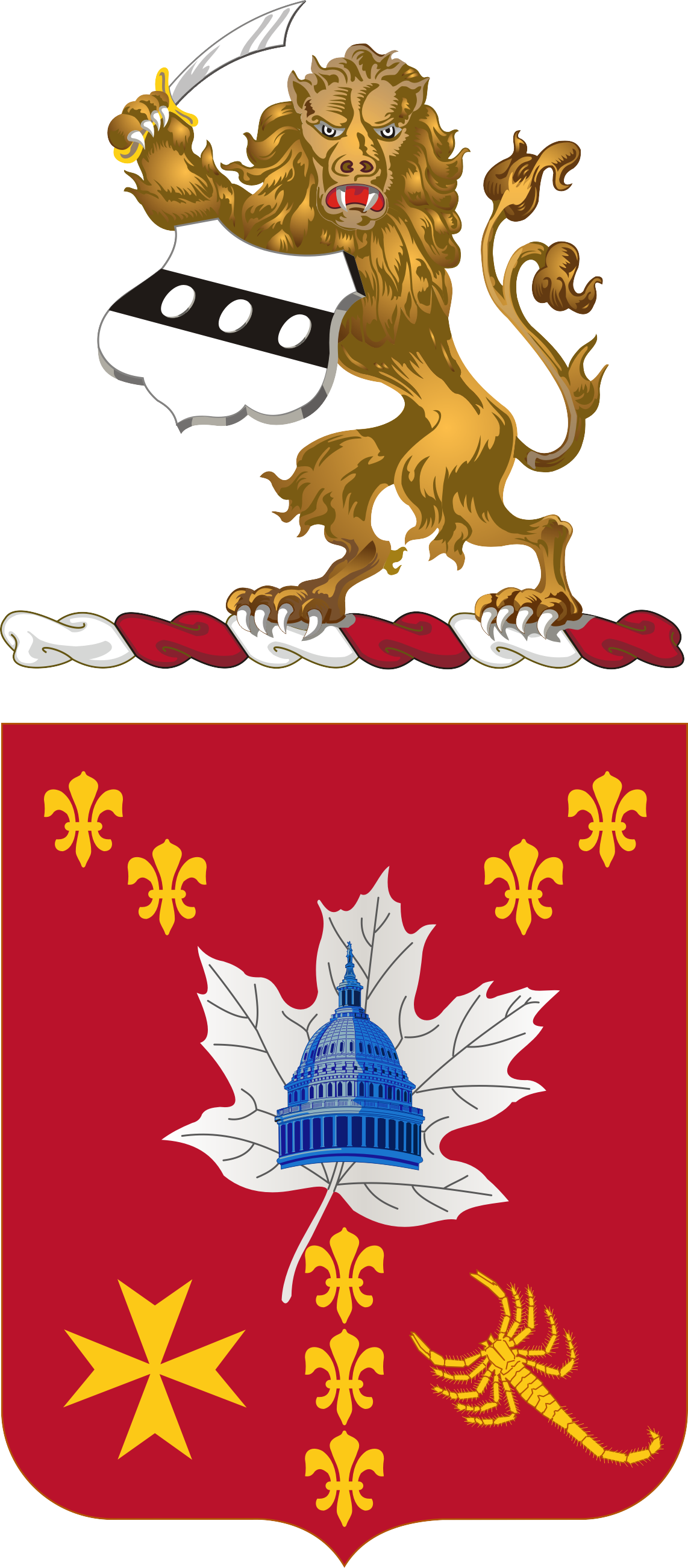
213th Air Defense Artillery
(formerly 213th Coast Artillery)
"The first defenders"

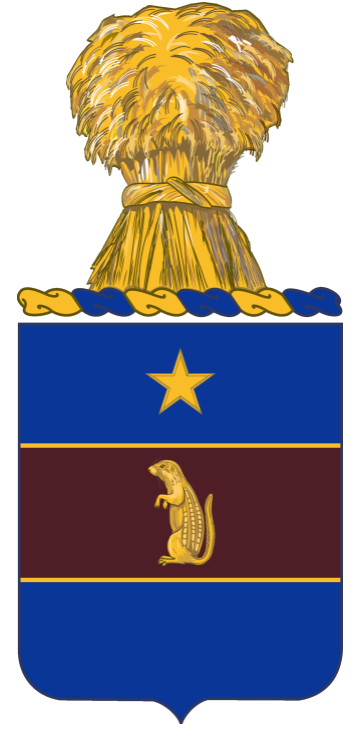
216th Air Defense Artillery
(formerly 206th Infantry & 216th Coast Artillery)
"For State and Country"

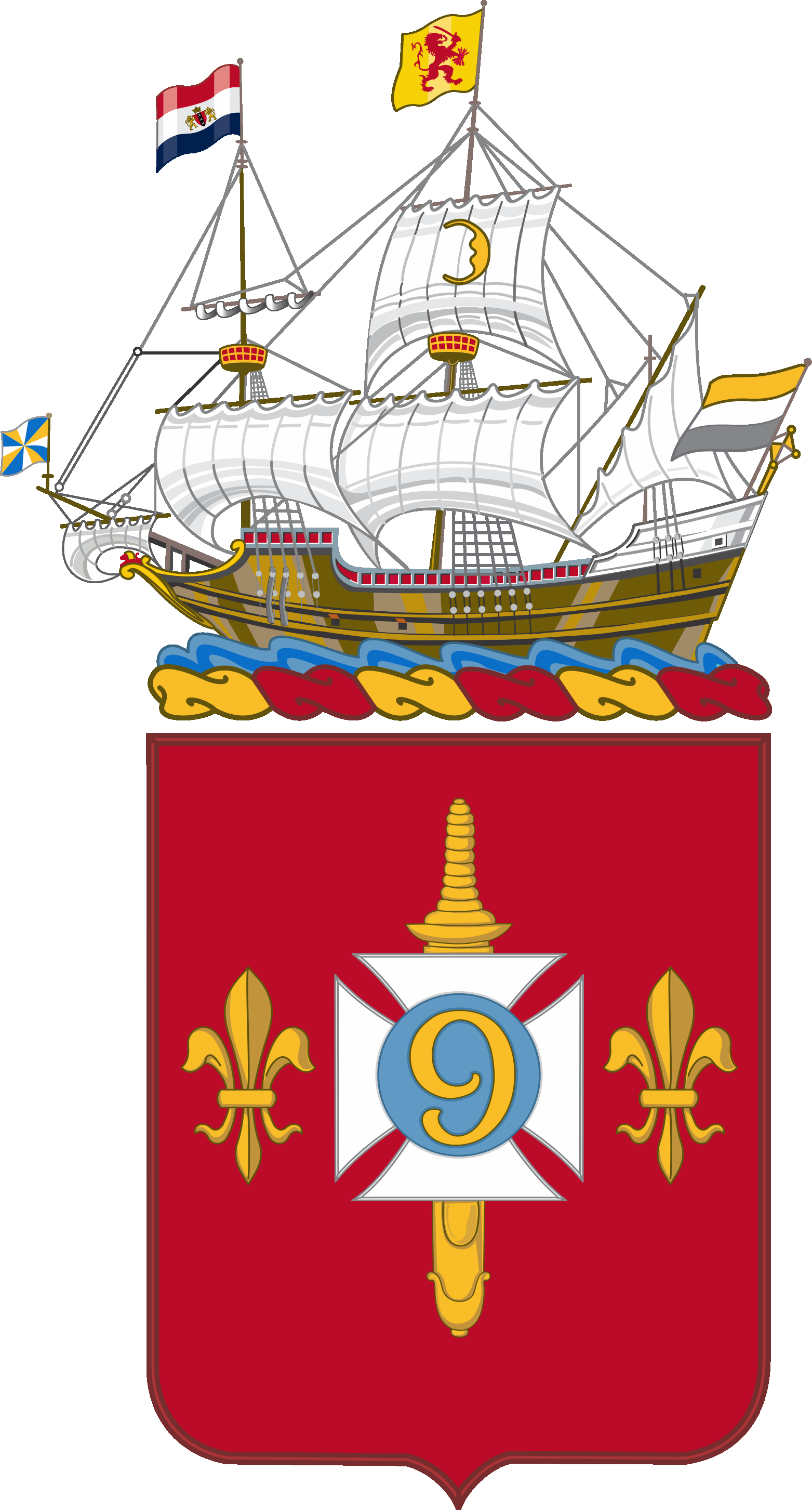
244th Air Defense Artillery
(formerly 244th Coast Artillery)
"Ratione aut vi" (By Reason Or By Force)

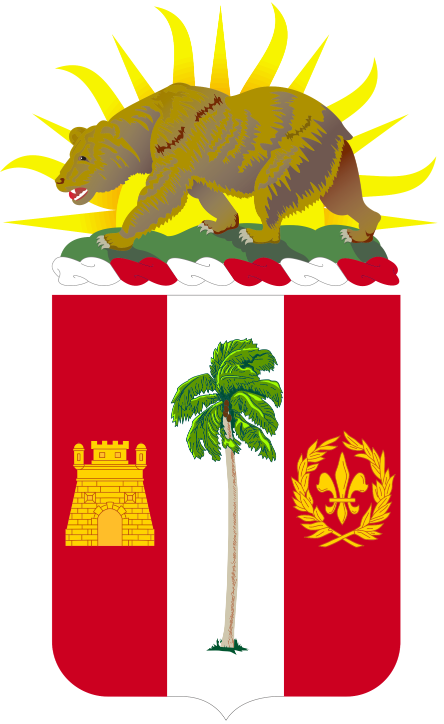
250th Air Defense Artillery
(formerly 250th Coast Artillery & 250th Artillery)
"Oram Occidentalem Defendimus" (We Defend the West Coast)
"First California"

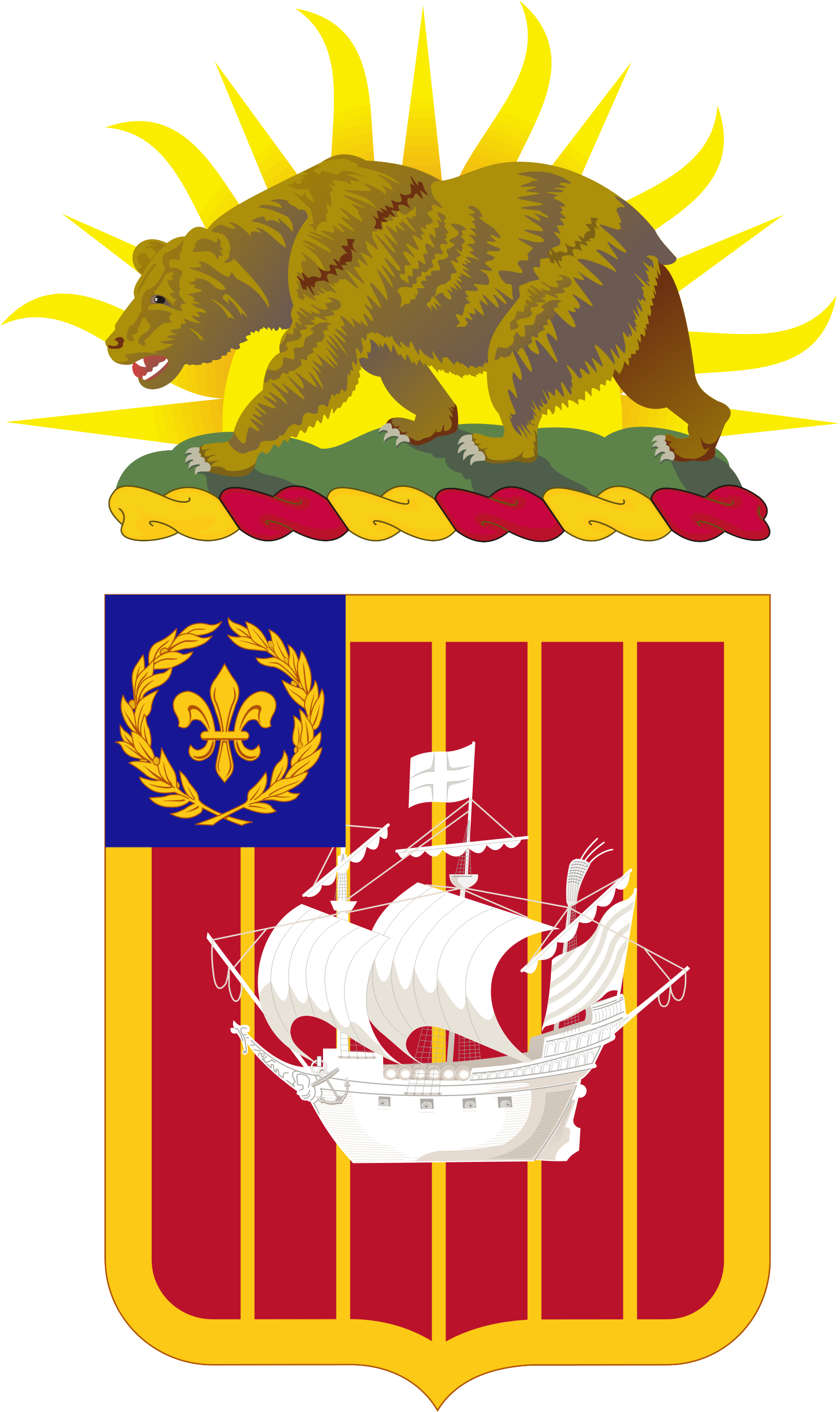
251st Air Defense Artillery
(formerly 251st Coast Artillery & 251st Artillery)
"We Aim to Hit"

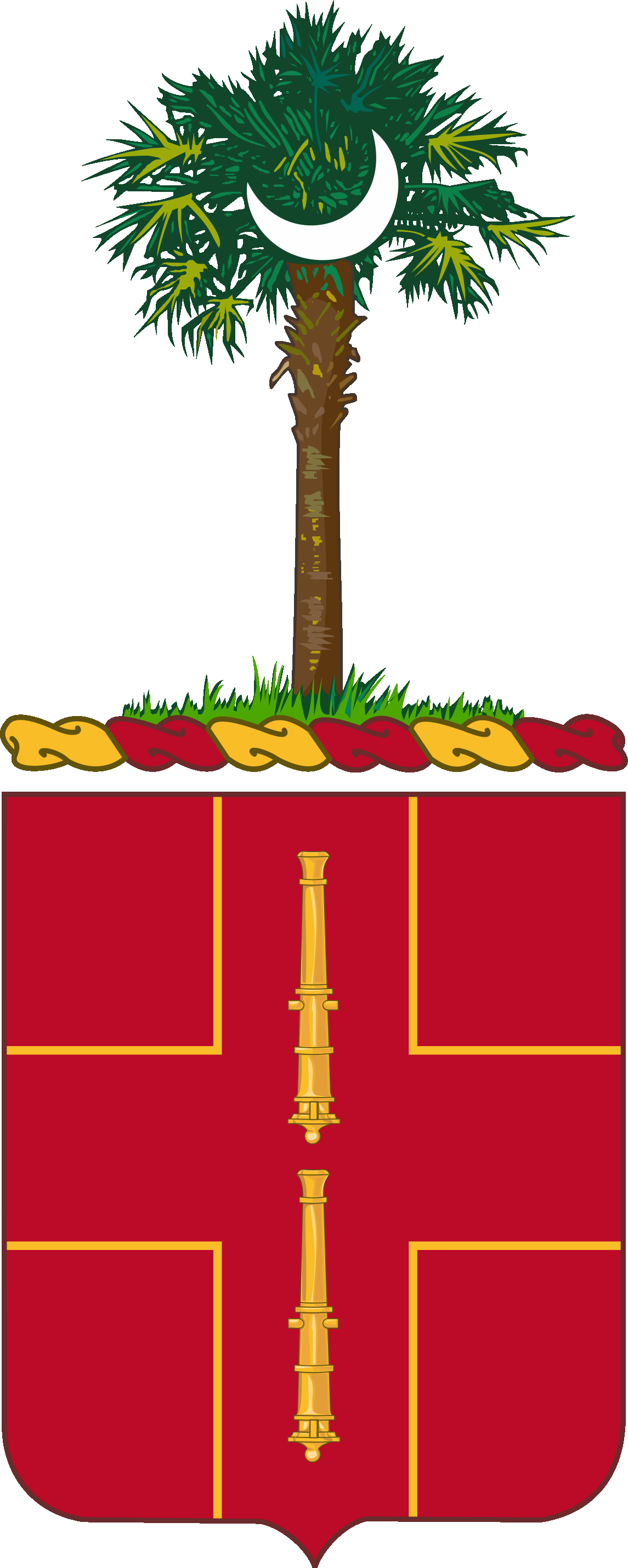
263rd Air Defense Artillery
(formerly 263rd Coast Artillery & 263rd Artillery)
"Unsurrendered"

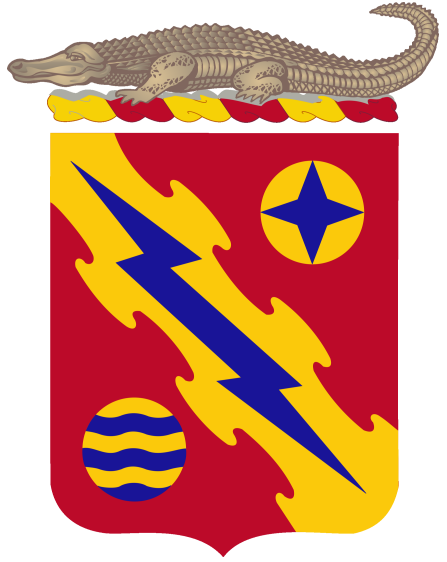
265th Air Defense Artillery
(formerly 265th Coast Artillery & 265th Artillery)
"Home and Country"

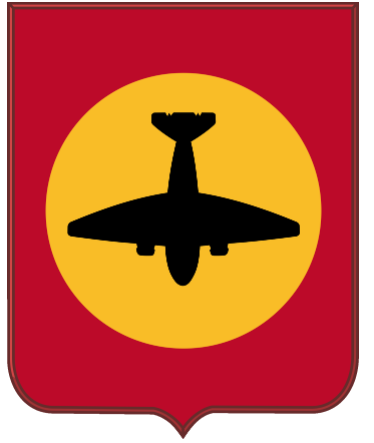
517th Air Defense Artillery
(formerly 517th Coast Artillery)
"We Sweep the Sky"

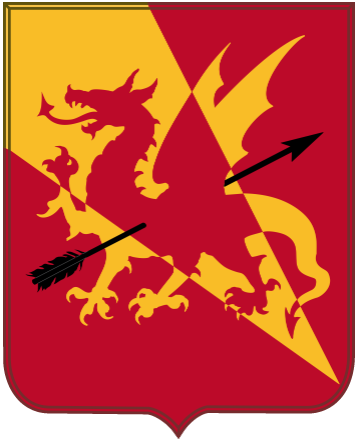
562nd Air Defense Artillery
(formerly 917th Coast Artillery & 562nd Artillery)
"Tuebor" (I Will Defend)

== Armor units ==
=== 1 to 100 ===
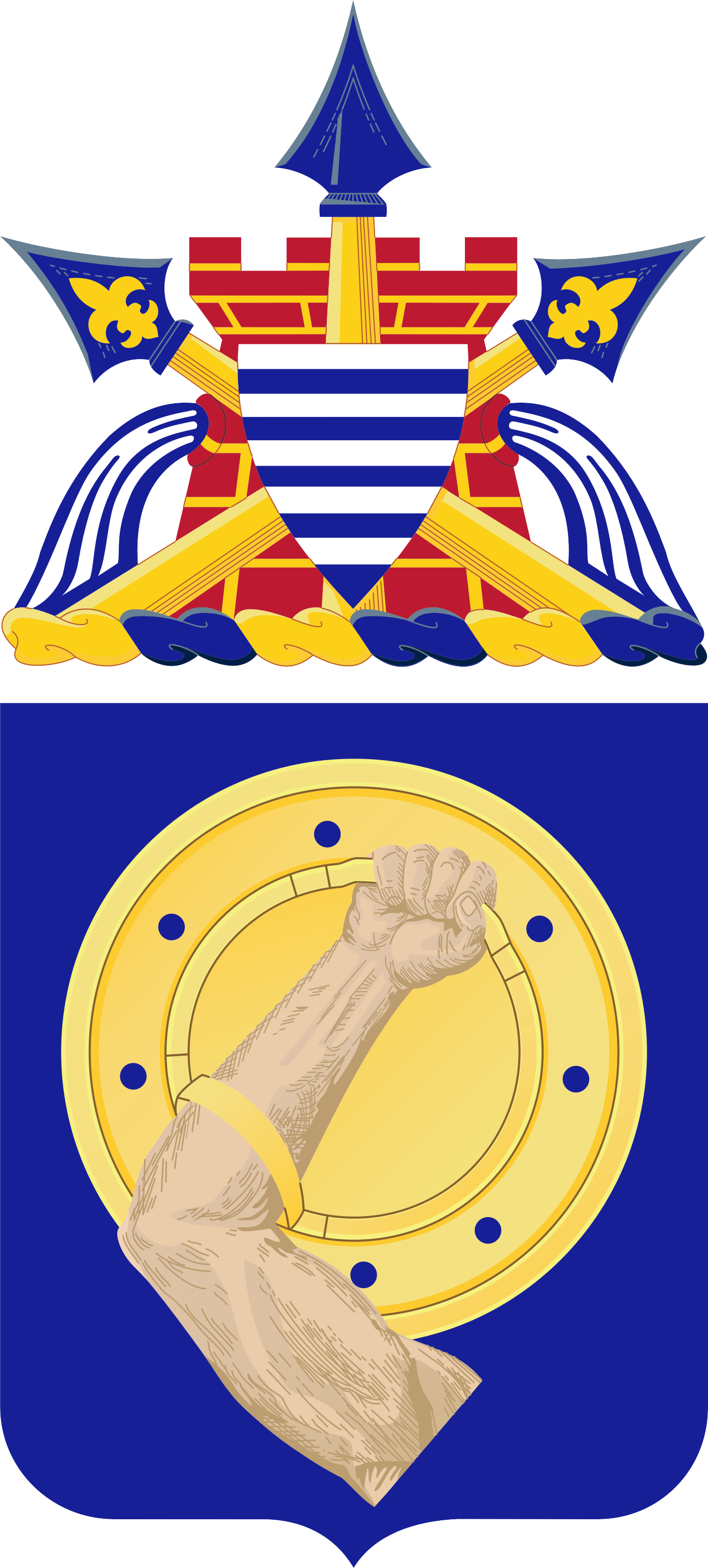
34th Armored
"The Strong Arm For Victory"
"Centurions"

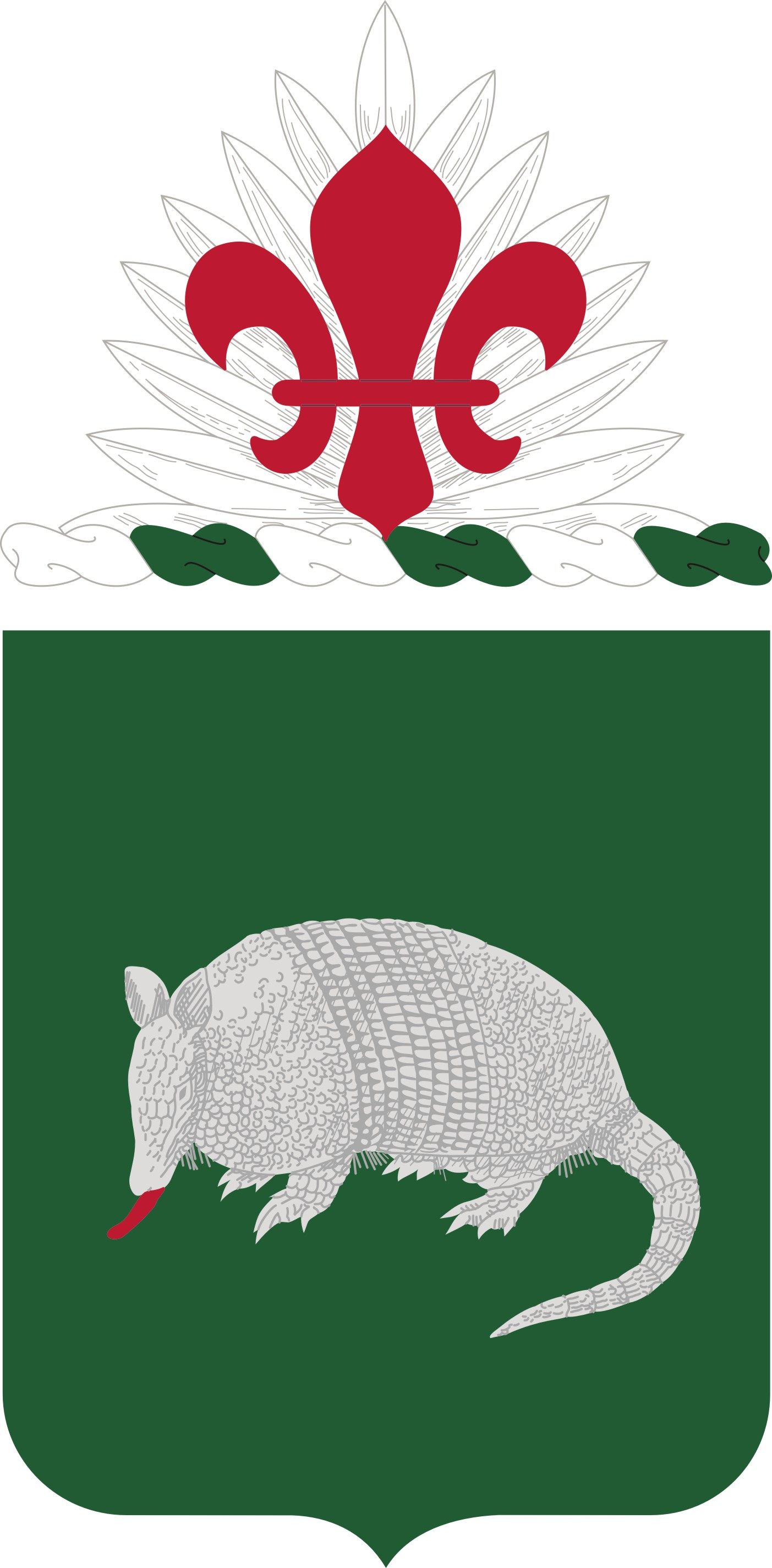
35th Armored
"Vincere Vel Mori" (To Conquer or Die)

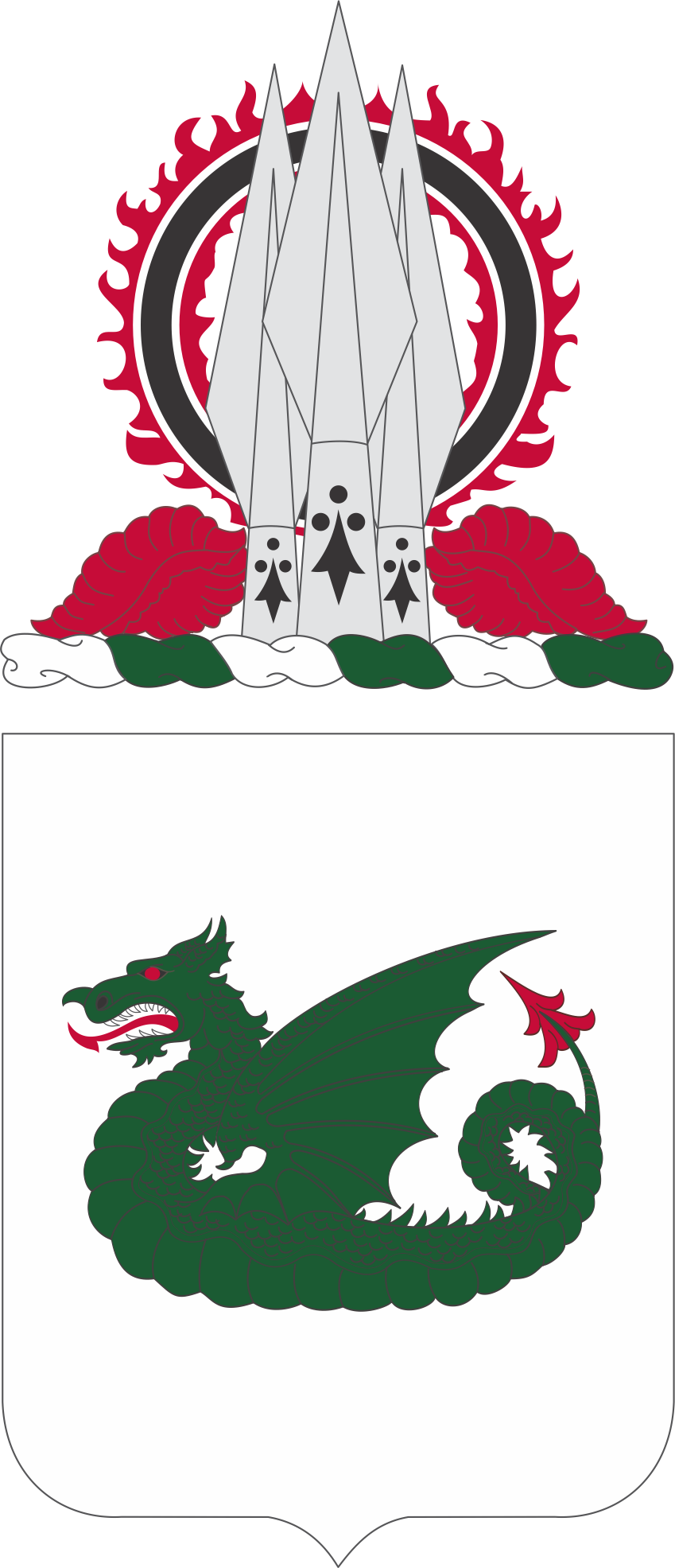
37th Armored
"Courage Conquers"

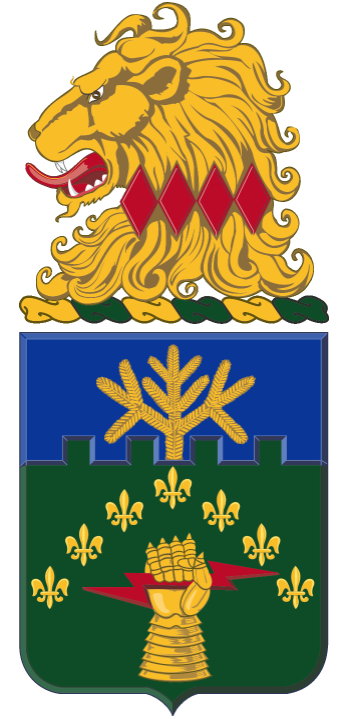
50th Armored
"Fortune Favors the Brave"

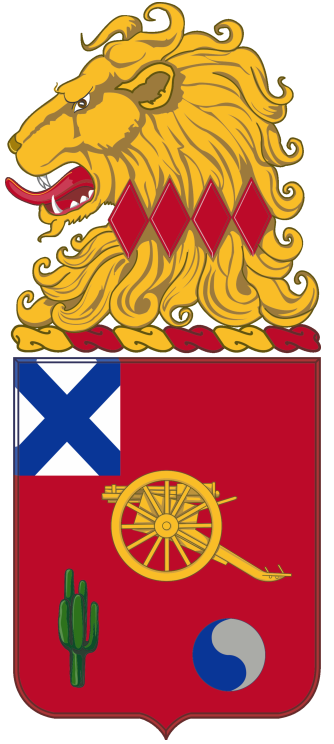
50th Armored (obsolete)
"In Via" (On The Way)

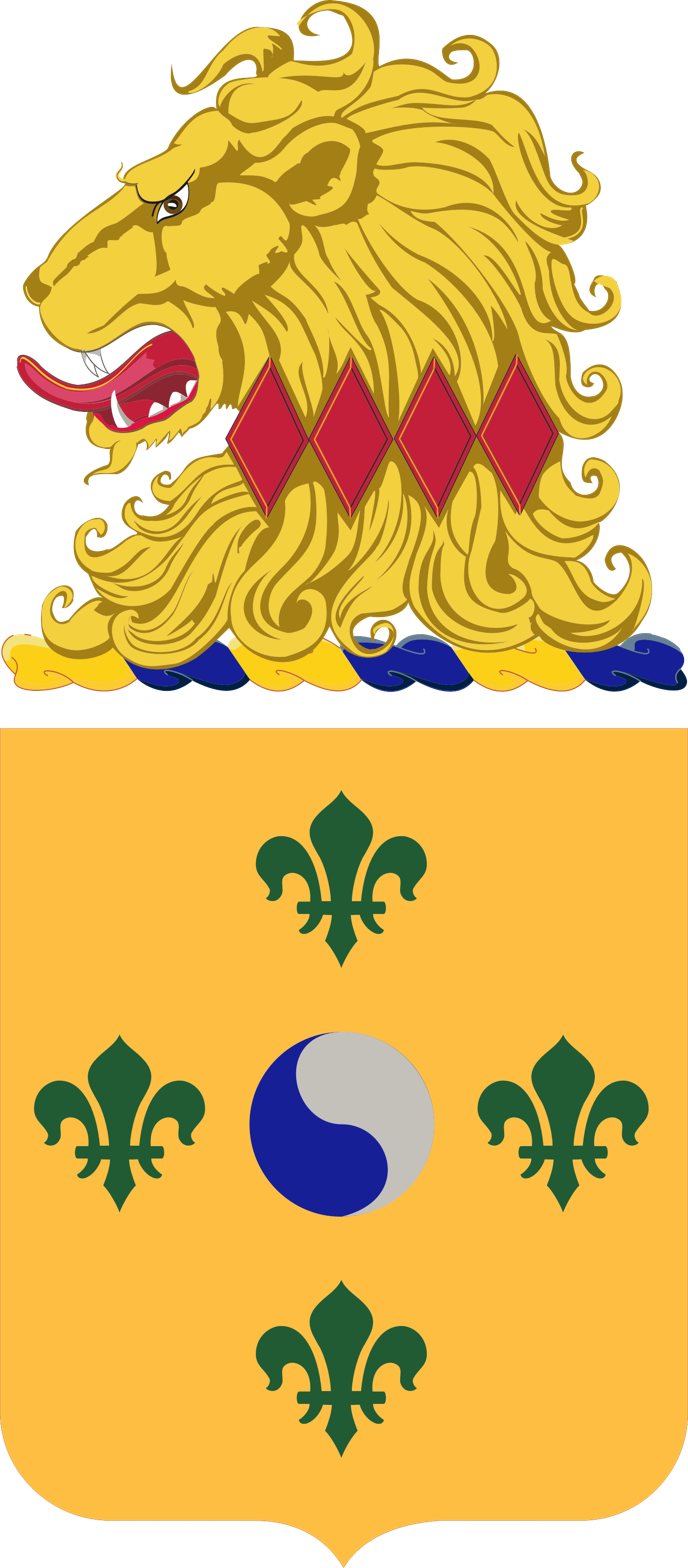
53d Armored
"Strength in steel"

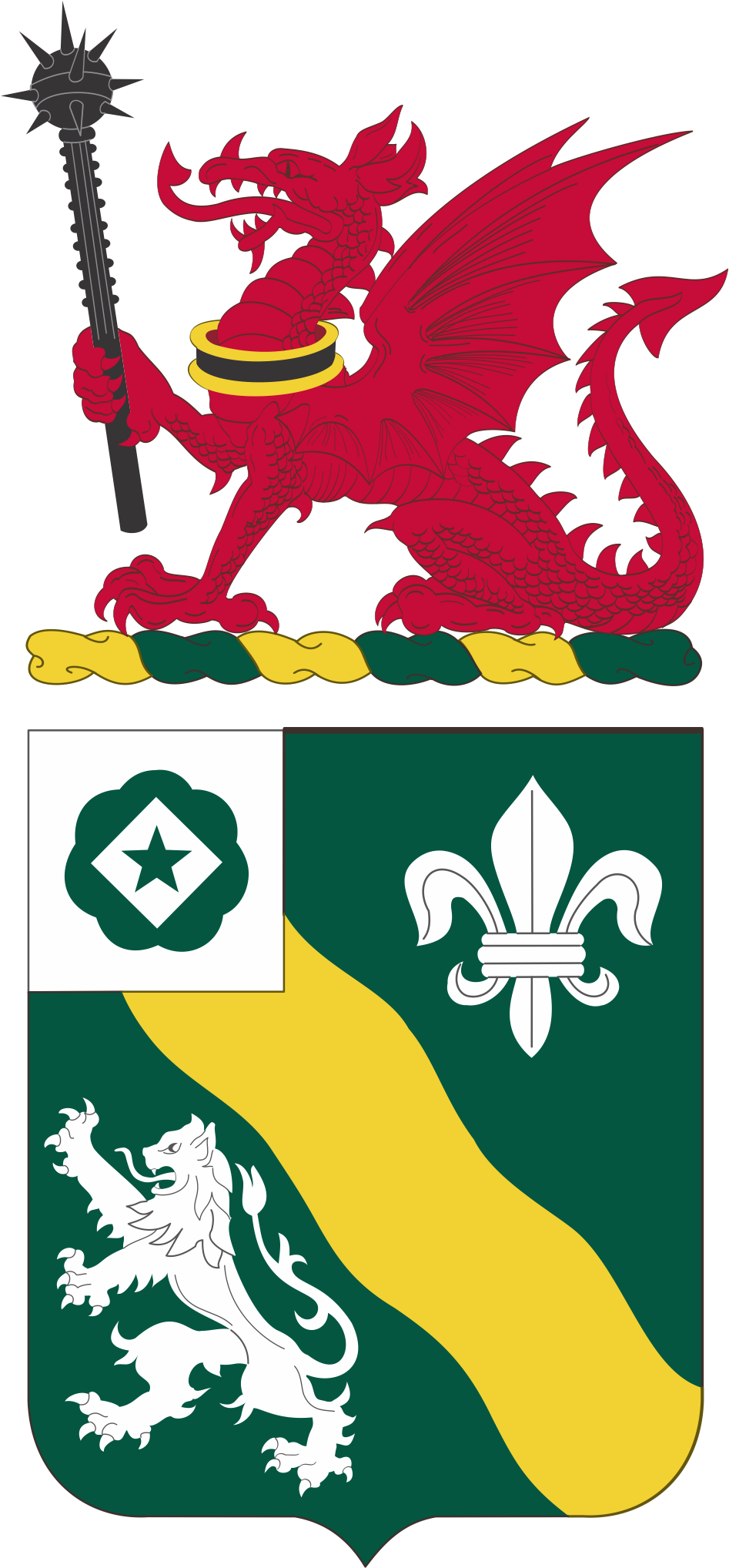
63d Armored
"Seek, Strike, Destroy"

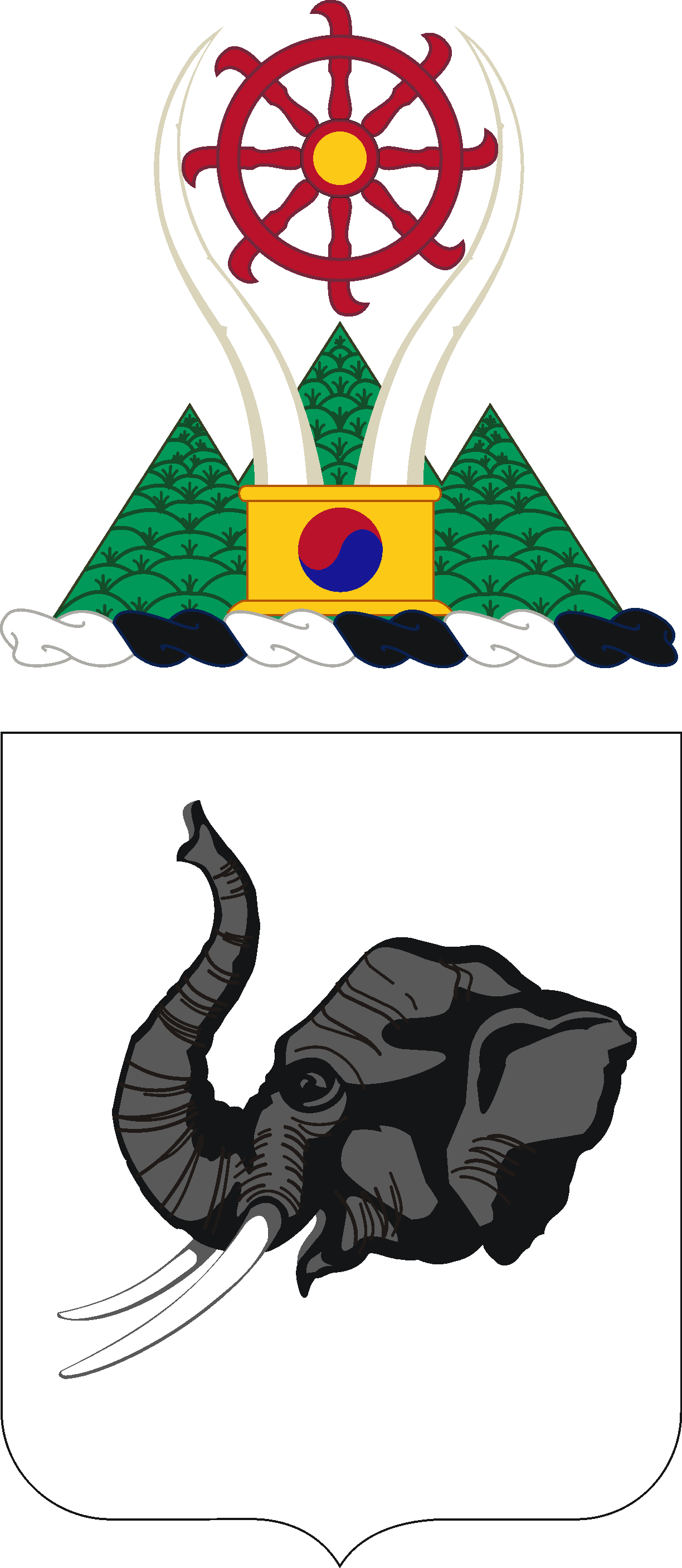
64th Armored
"We Pierce"

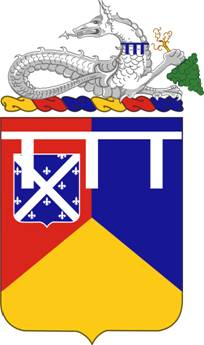
66th Armored
"Semper in Hostes"
"Iron Knights"

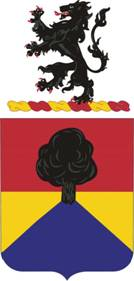
67th Armored
(formerly 67th Infantry)
No motto

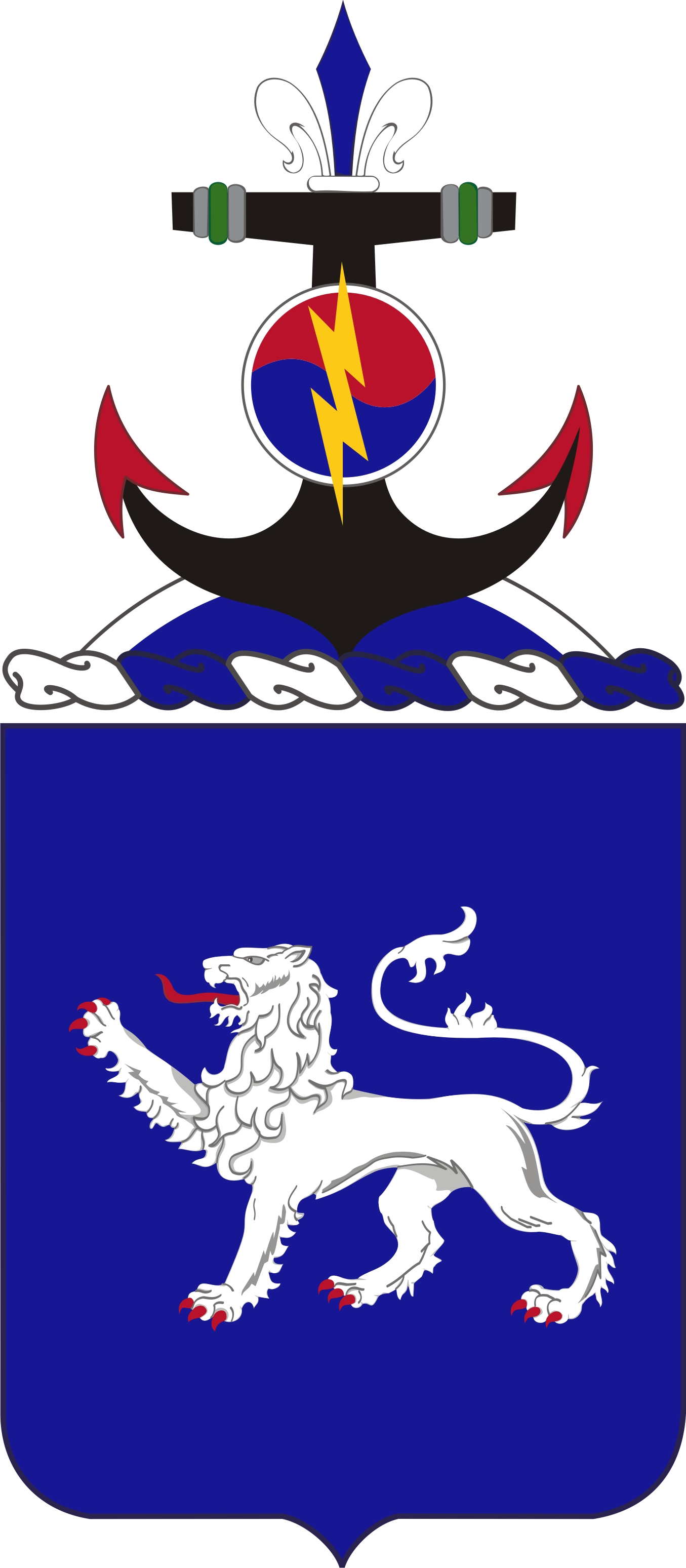
68th Armored
(formerly 68th Infantry less crest)
"Ventre a Terre" (With Great Speed)

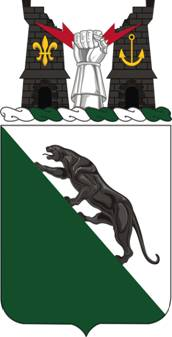
69th Armored
"Vitesse et Puissance" (Speed and Power)

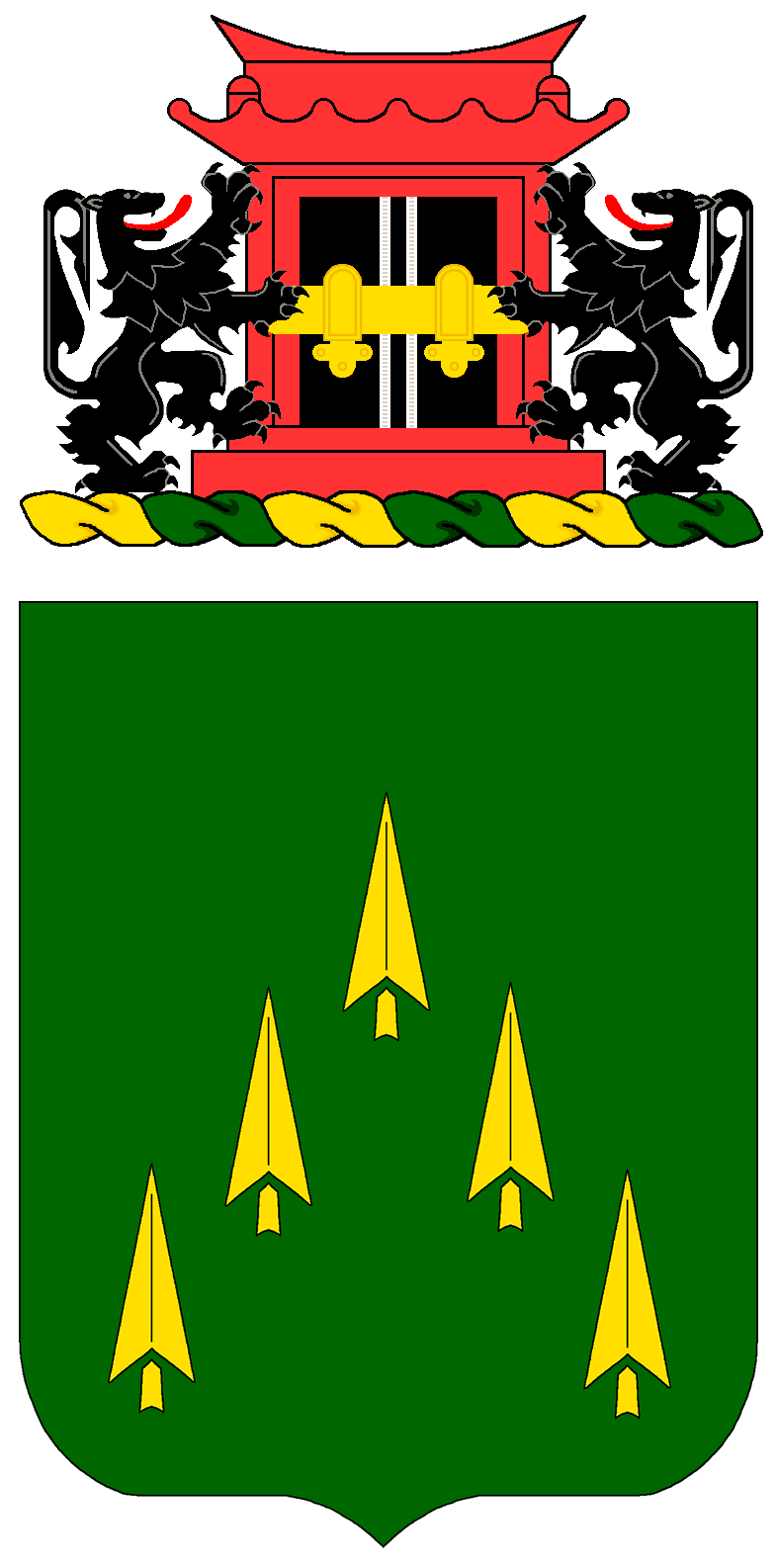
70th Armored
"Strike Swiftly"

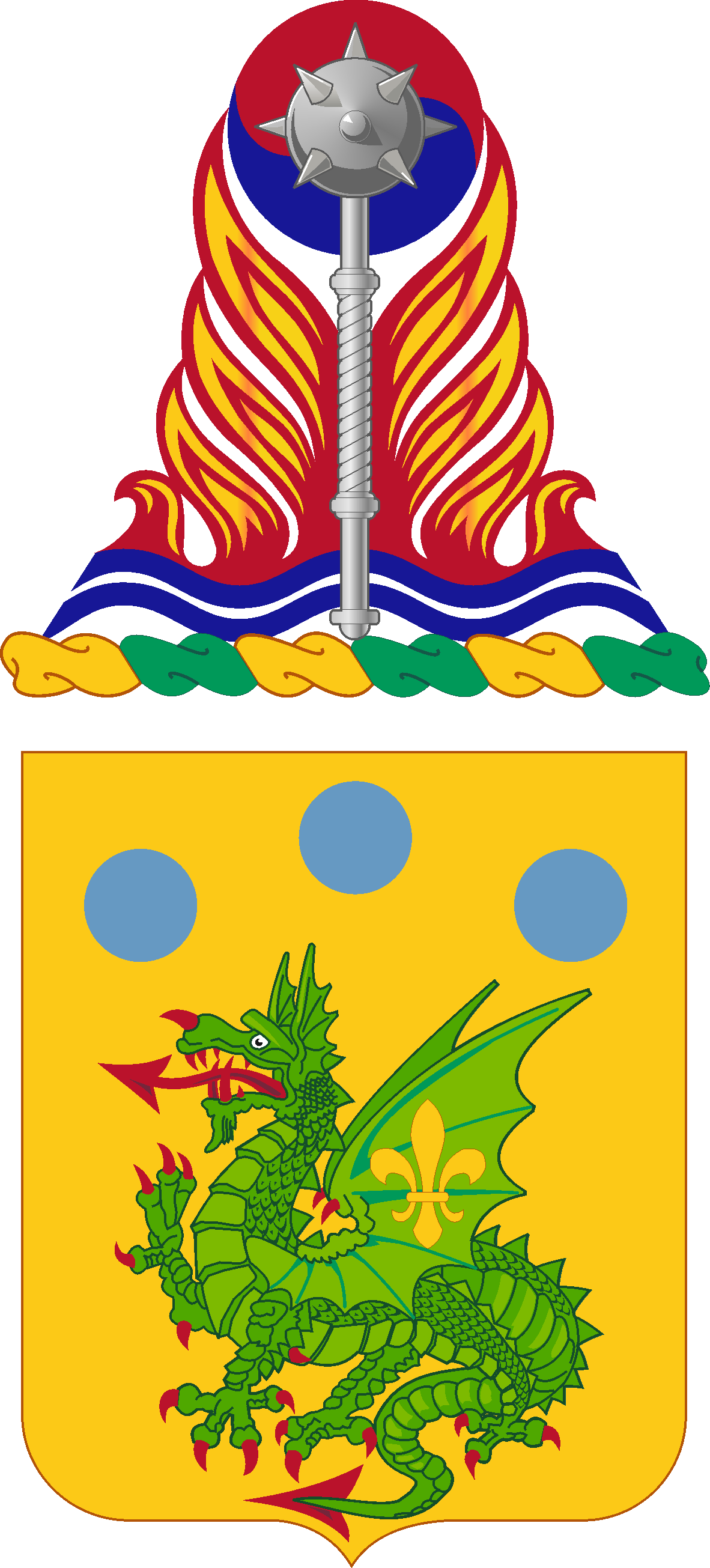
72d Armored
"Crusaders"

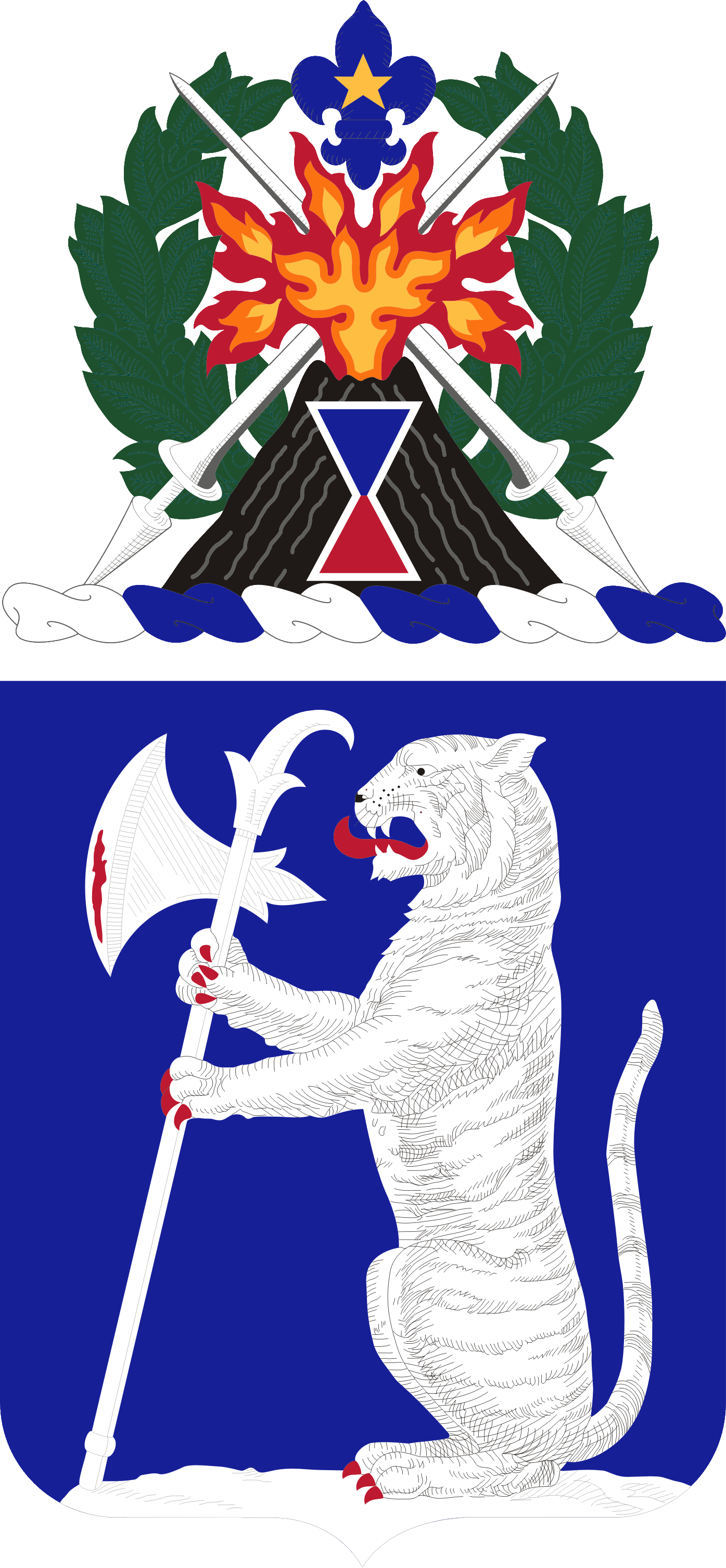
77th Armored
"Insiste Firmiter" (Stand to it Stoutly)
"Steel Tigers"

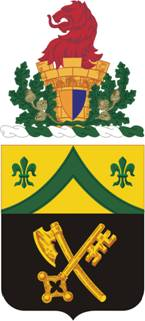
81st Armored
"Supero Omnia" (To Surpass All)

=== 101 to 200 ===
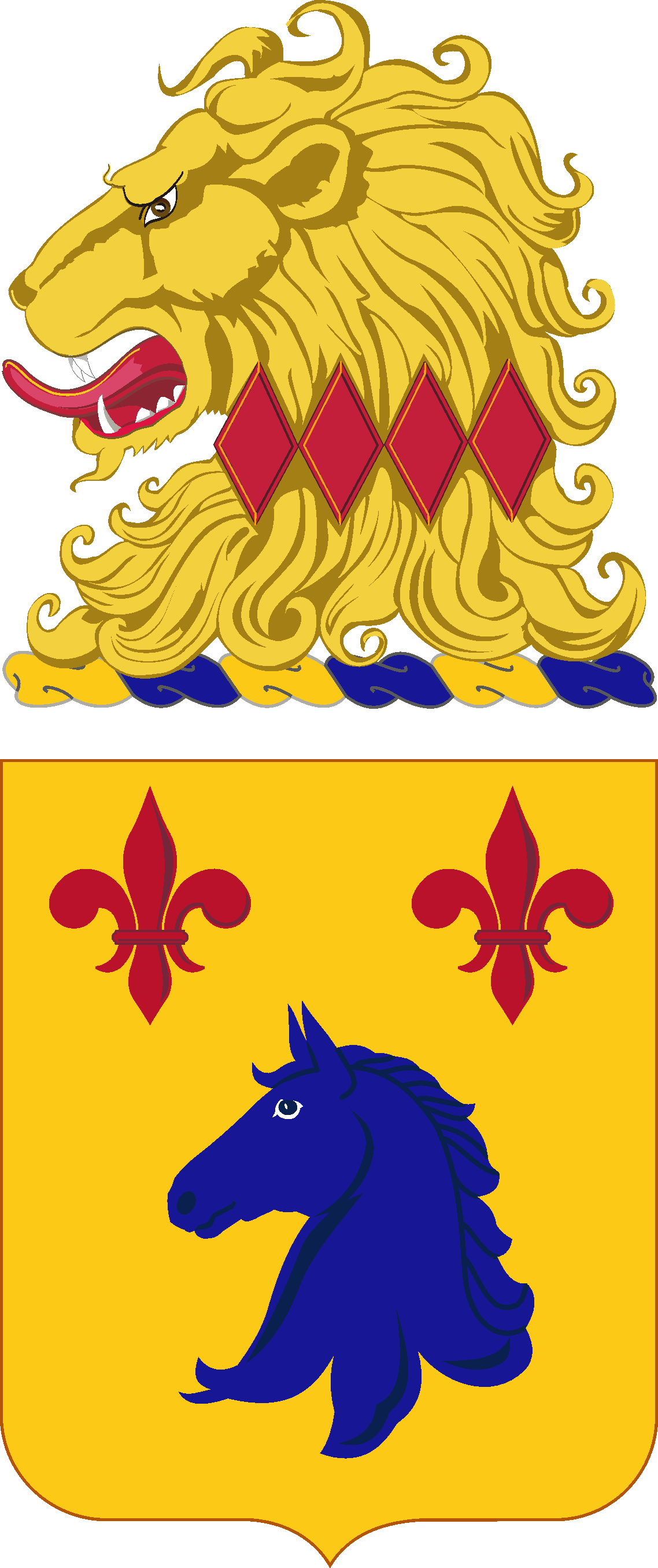
102d Cavalry
(formerly 102nd Cavalry & 102nd Armored Cavalry)
"Fide Et Fortitudine" (By Fidelity and Fortitude)

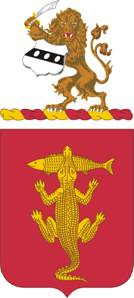
103d Armored
"Expedite" (With Dispatch)

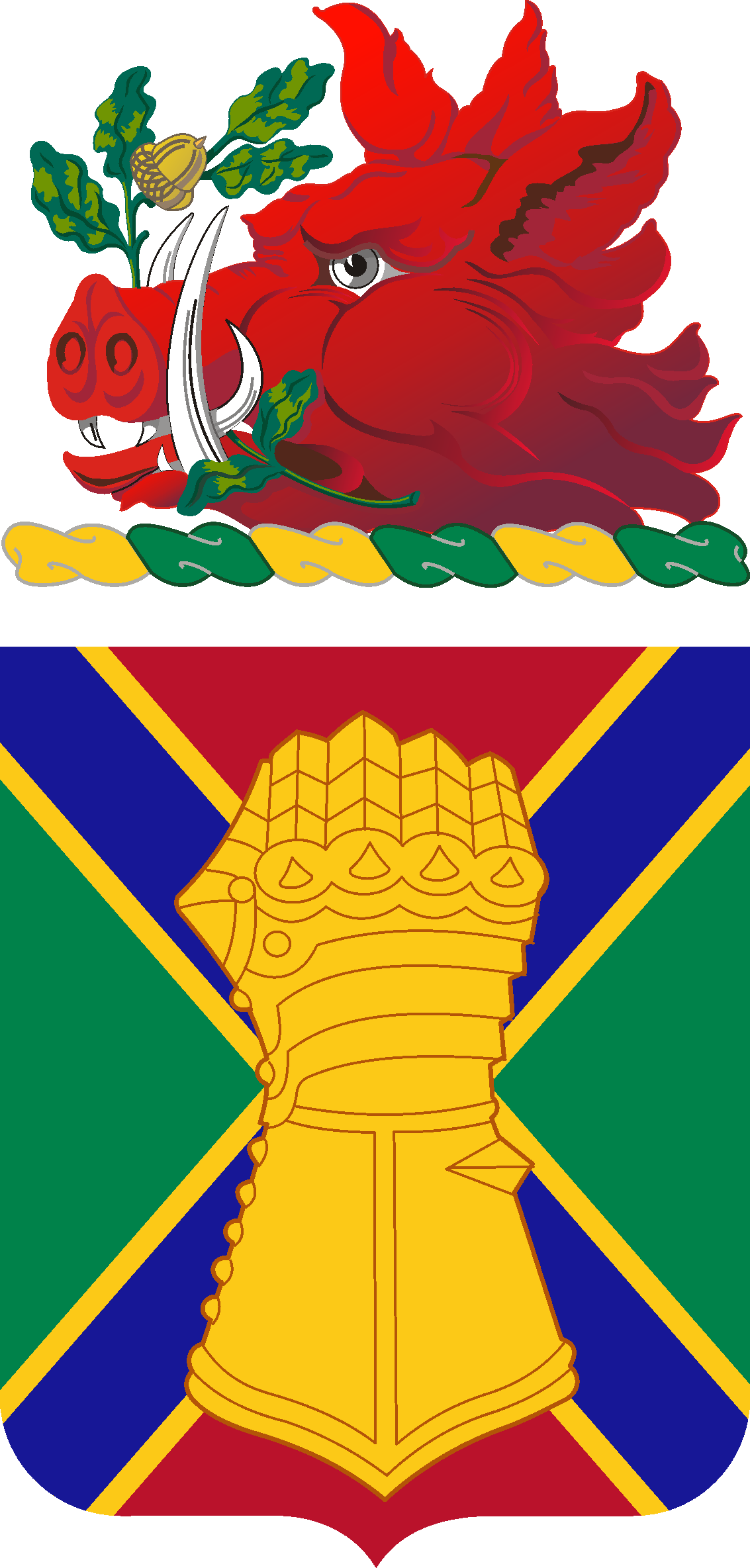
108th Armored
"Strike Swiftly"

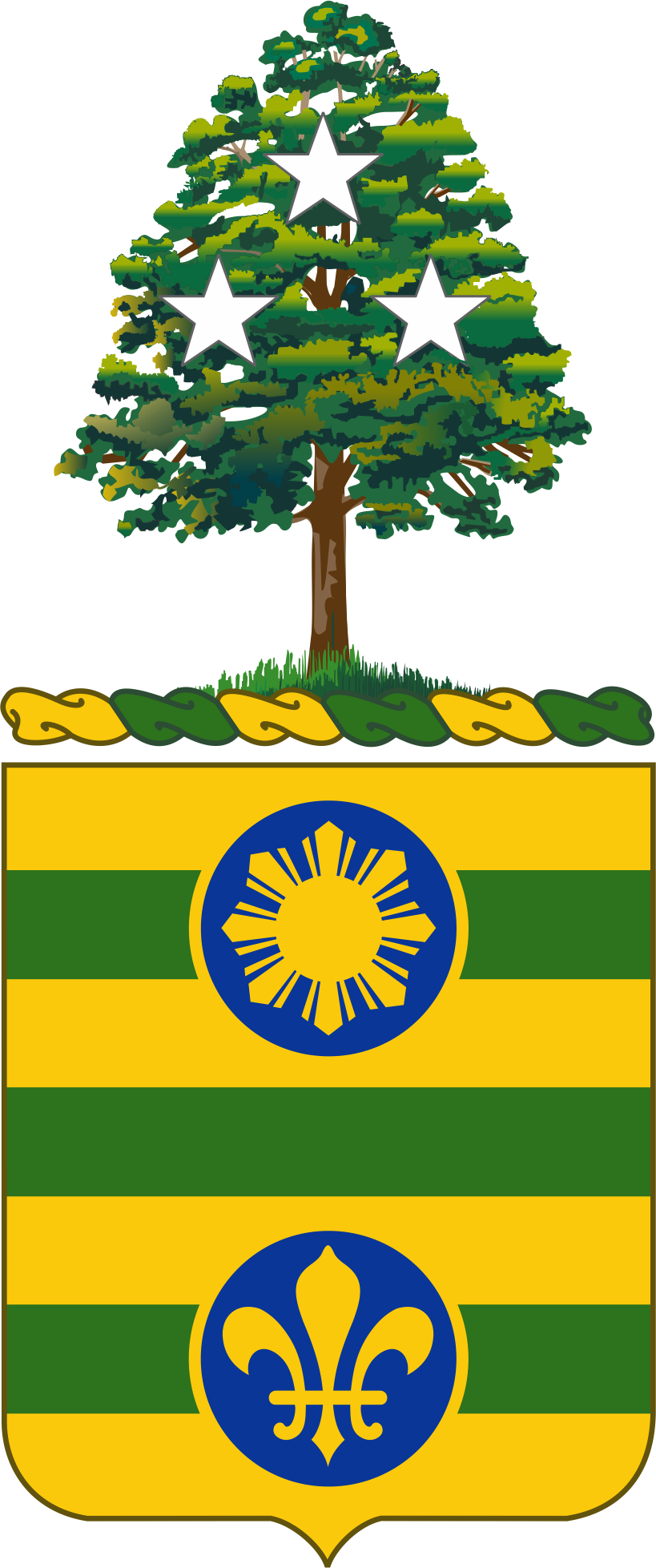
109th Armored
"Unleashed Lightning"

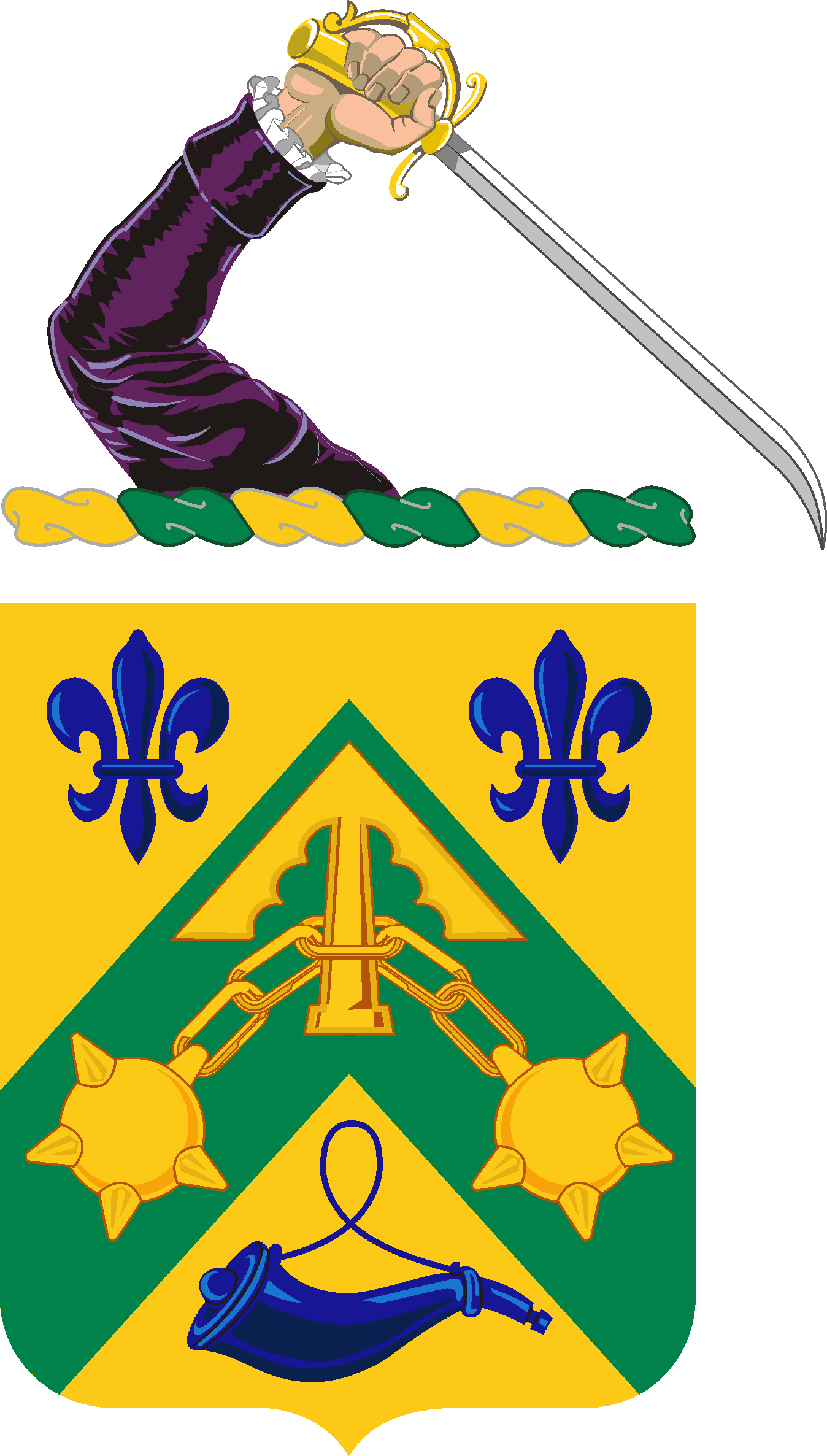
110th Armored
"Above Equal"

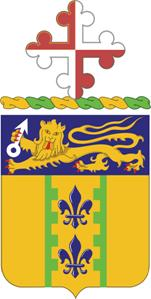
115th Armored
"Decision"

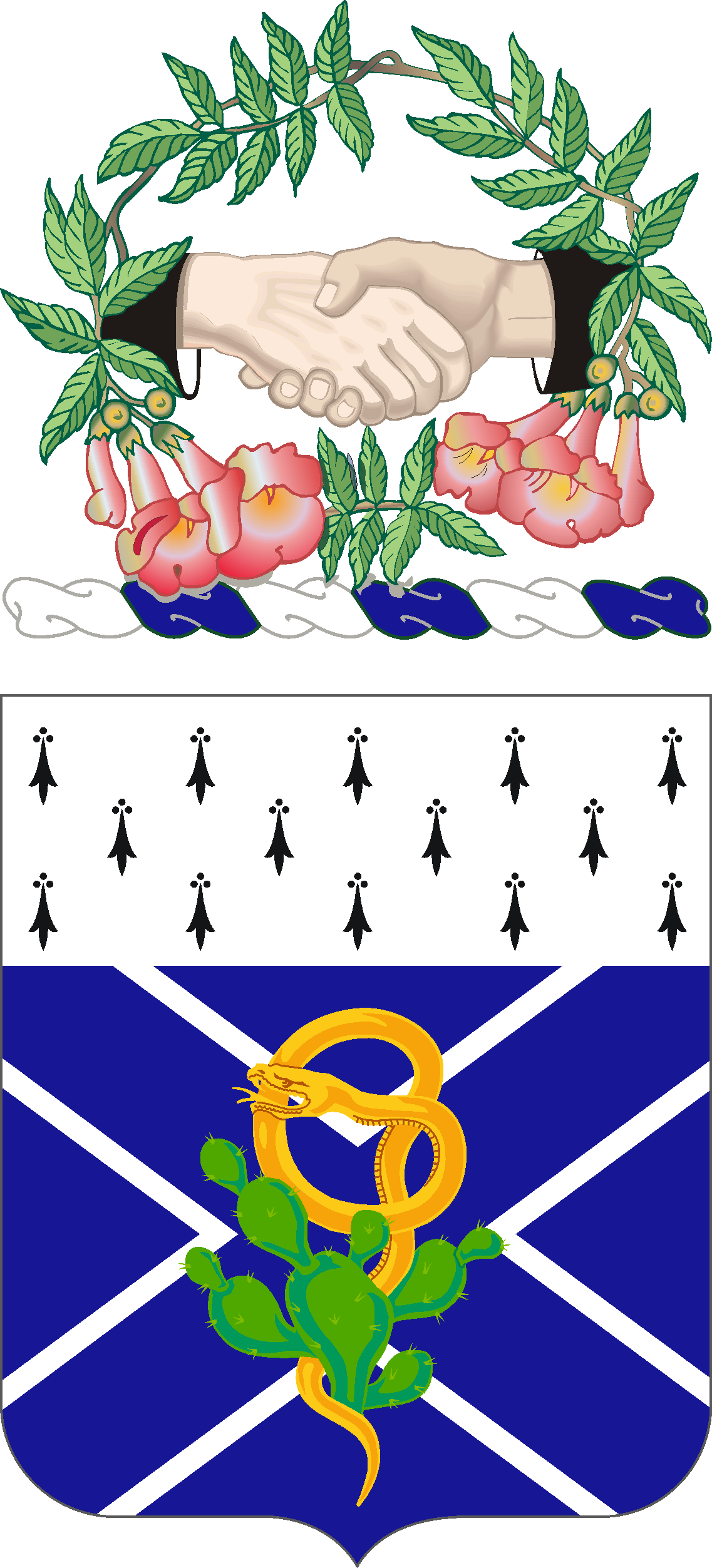
123d Armored
(former 149th Infantry)
"Esto Perpetua" (May It Live Forever)

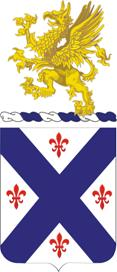
126th Infantry
"Courage Sans Peur" (Courage Without Fear)

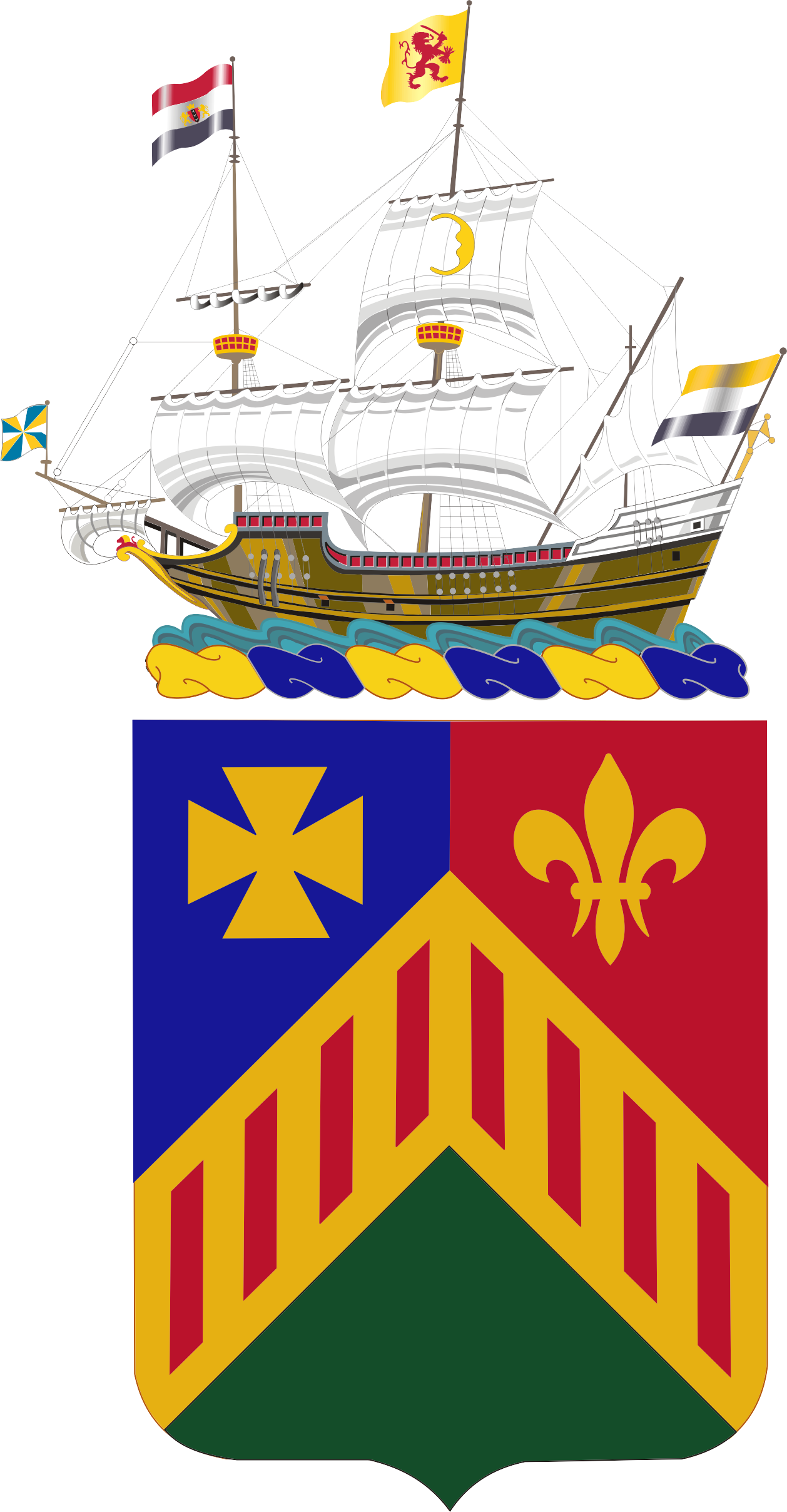
127th Armored
"Probe Pierce Pursue"

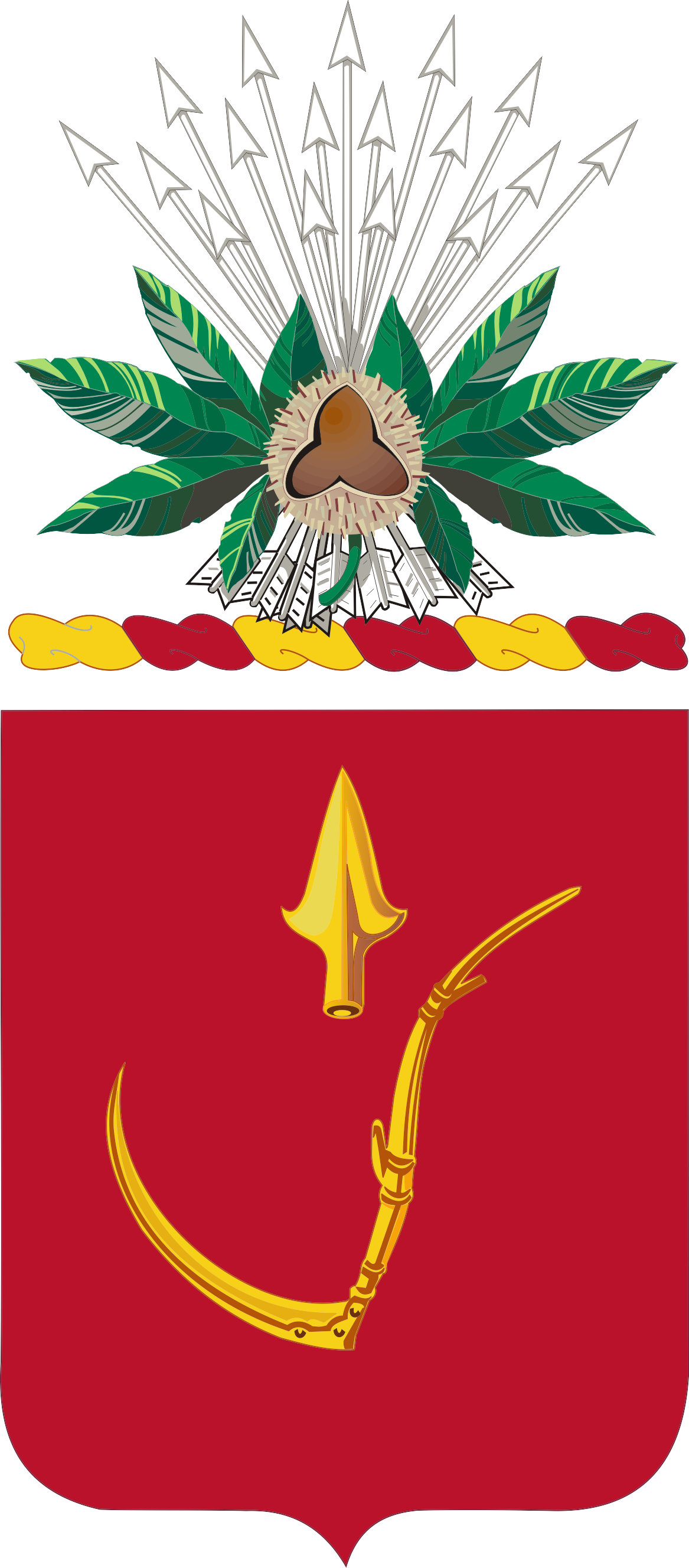
137th Armored
"Mow 'em Down"

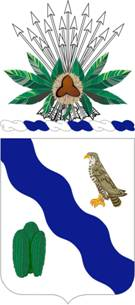
145th Armored
(formerly 145th Infantry and 145th Regiment)
"Excel"

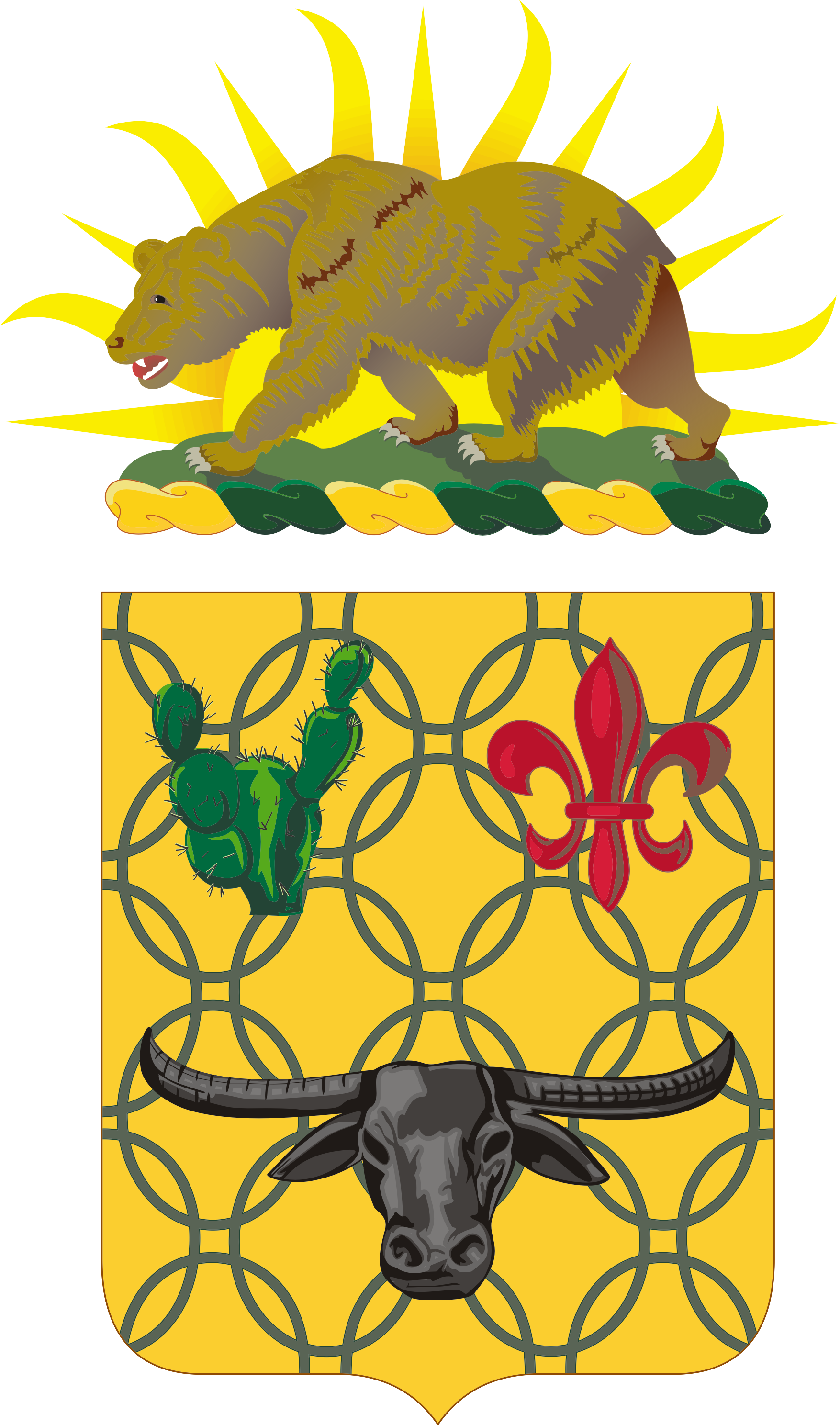
149th Armored
"Men and Steel"

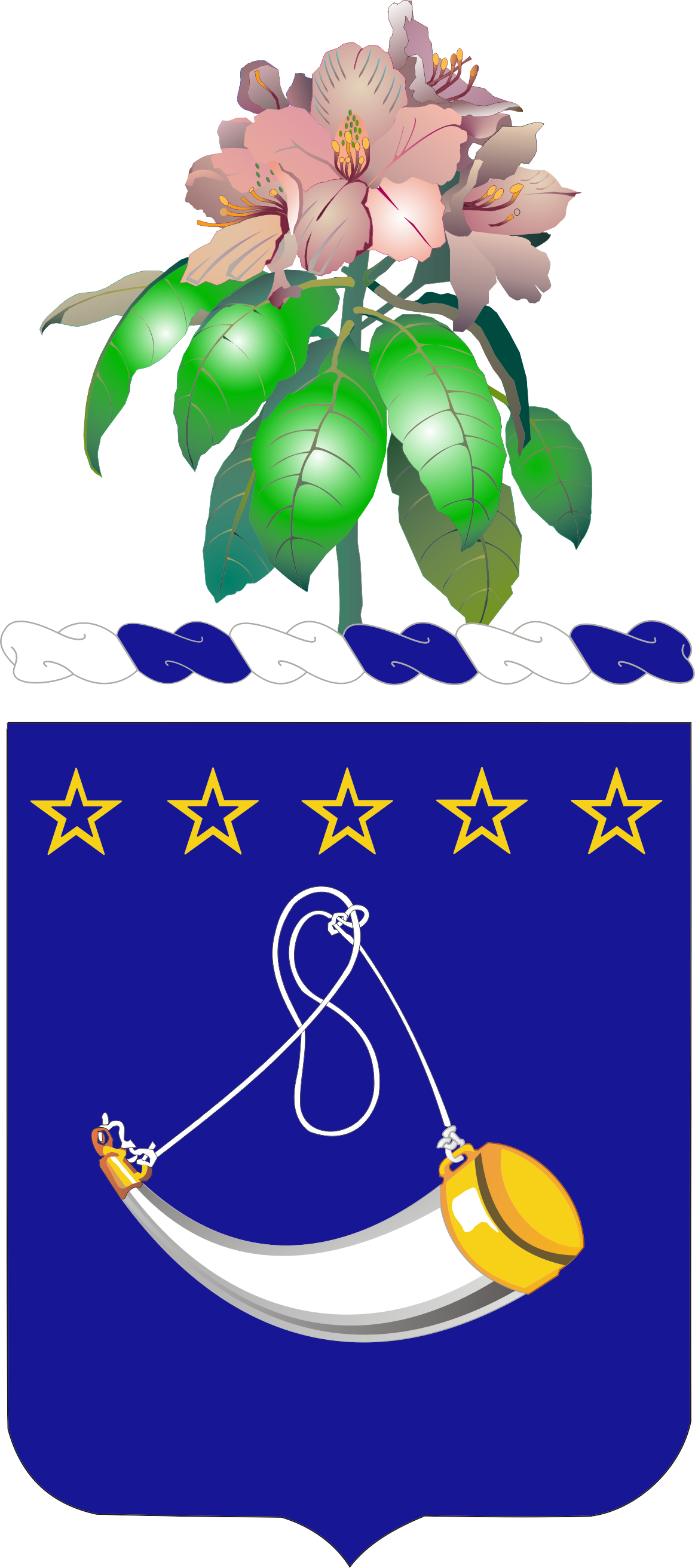
150th Cavalry
(former 150th Infantry)
"We Can Take It

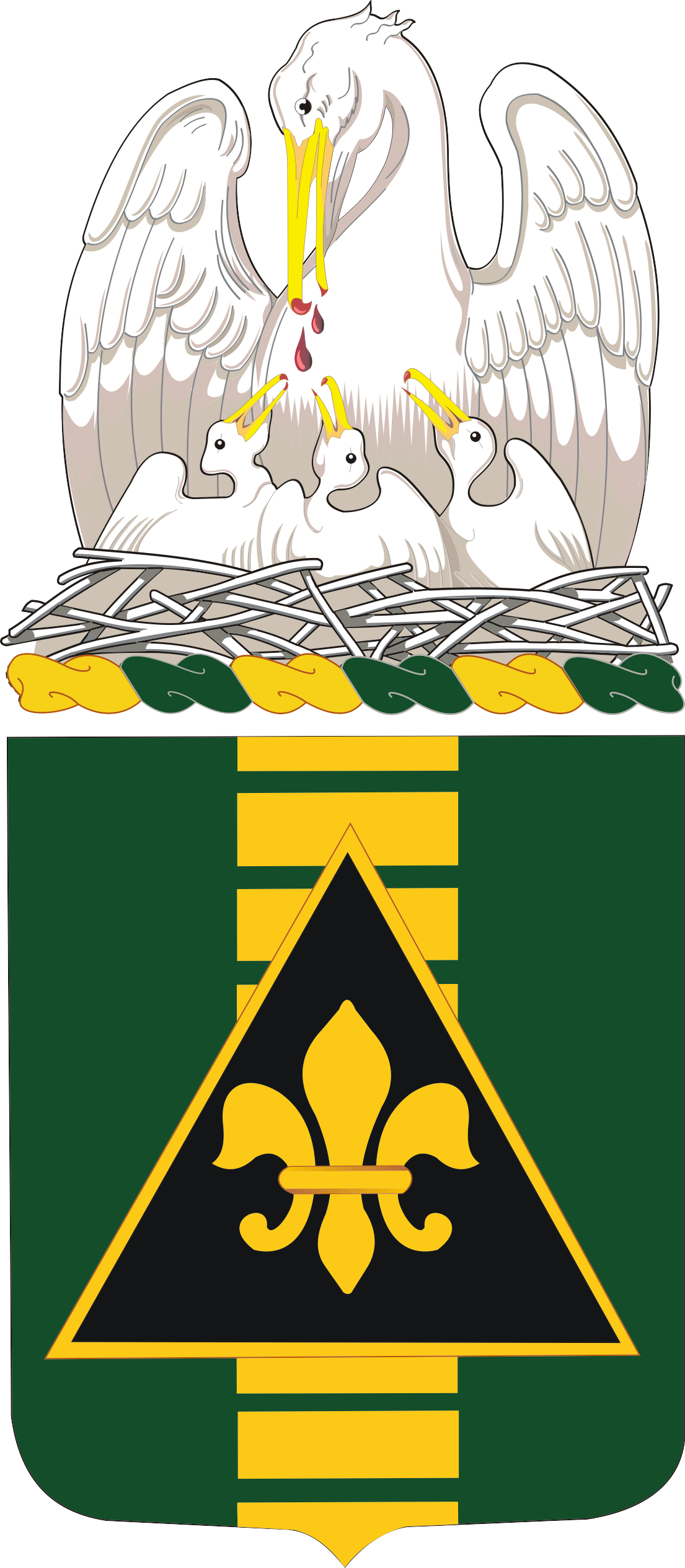
156th Armored
"First to Fight"

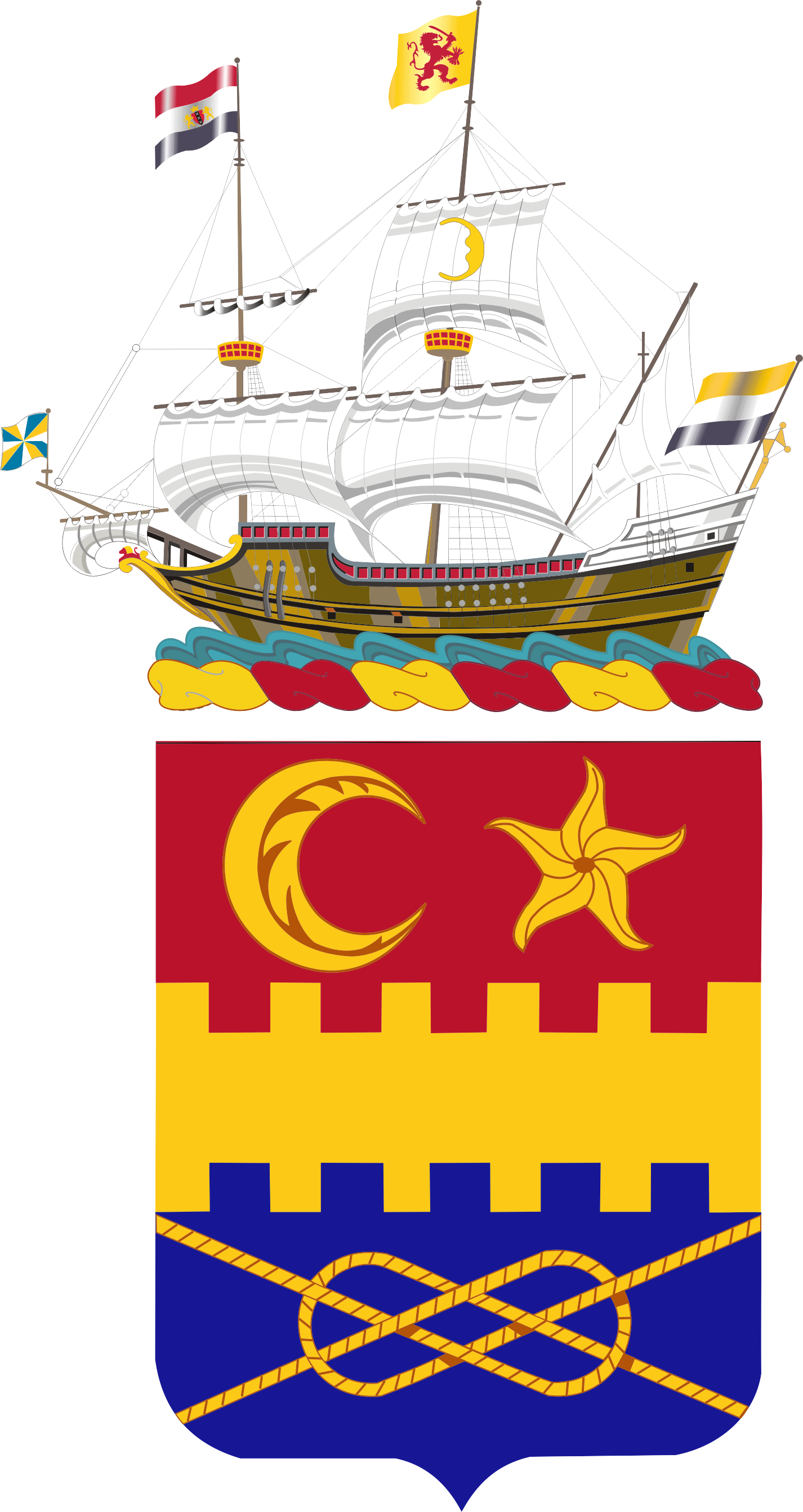
174th Armored
"Strong in Spirit"

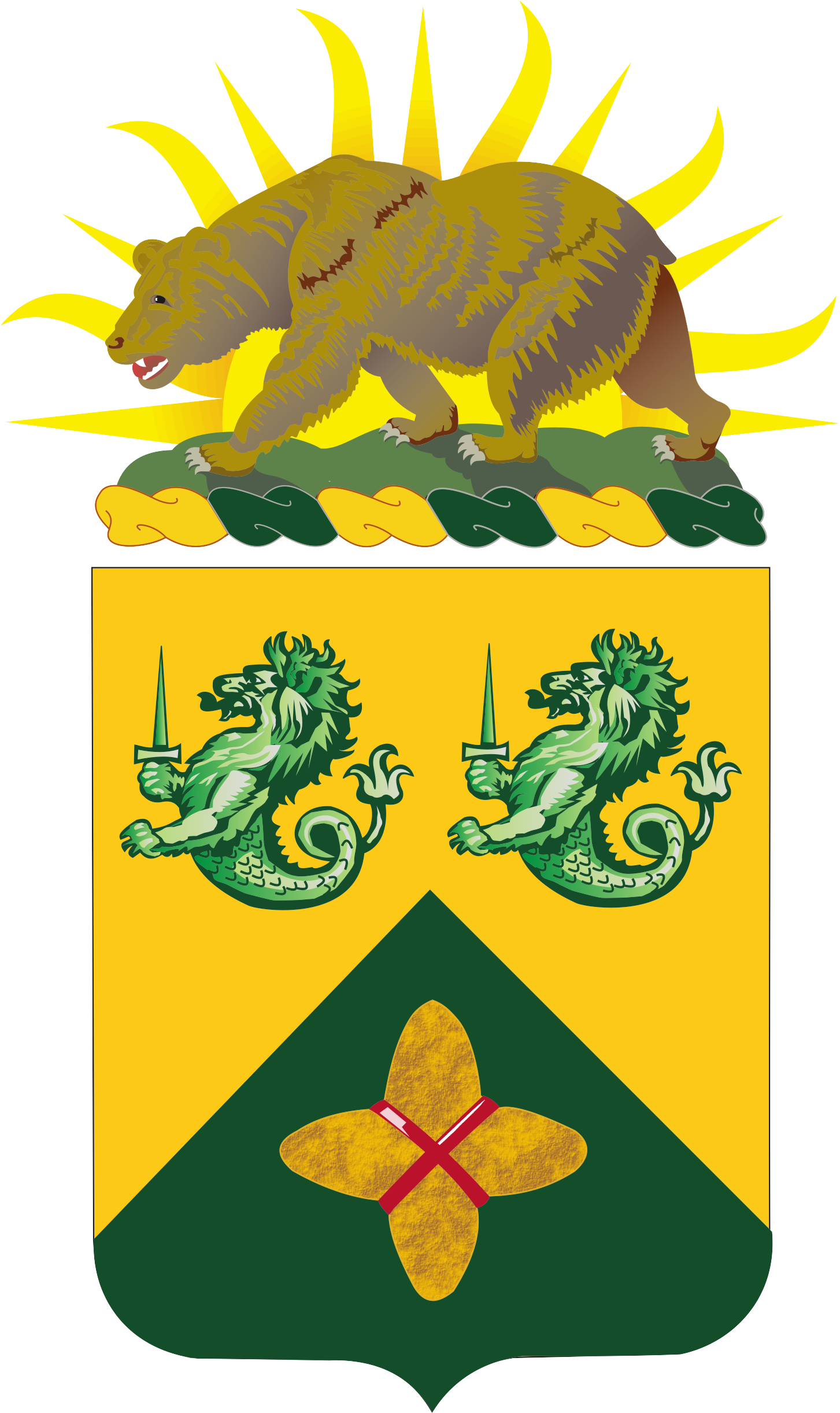
185th Armored
"Fulman Jacio" (I Hurl The Thunderbolt)

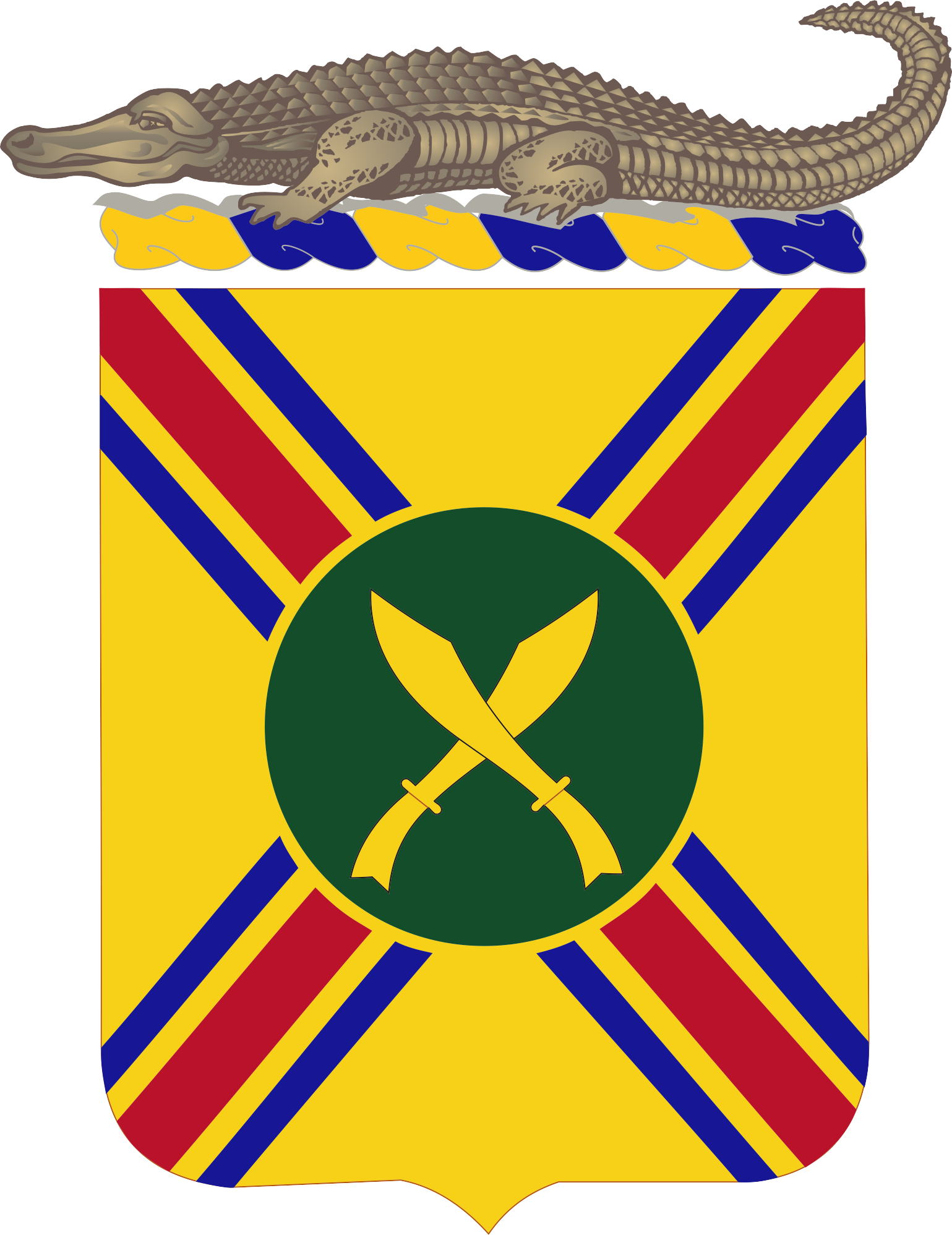
187th Armored
"Sole in Morte Cedimus" (We Yield Only In Death)

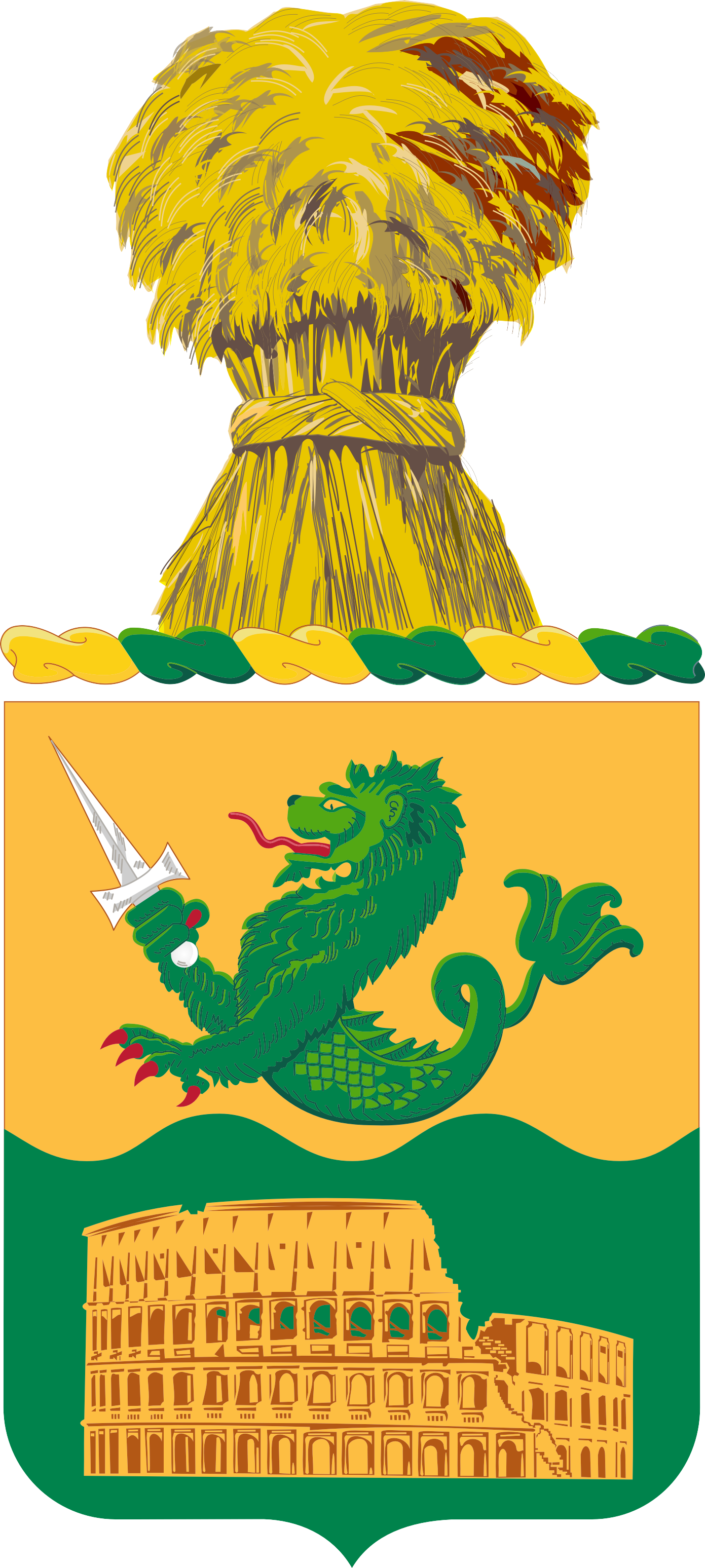
194th Armored
"The Arm of Decision"

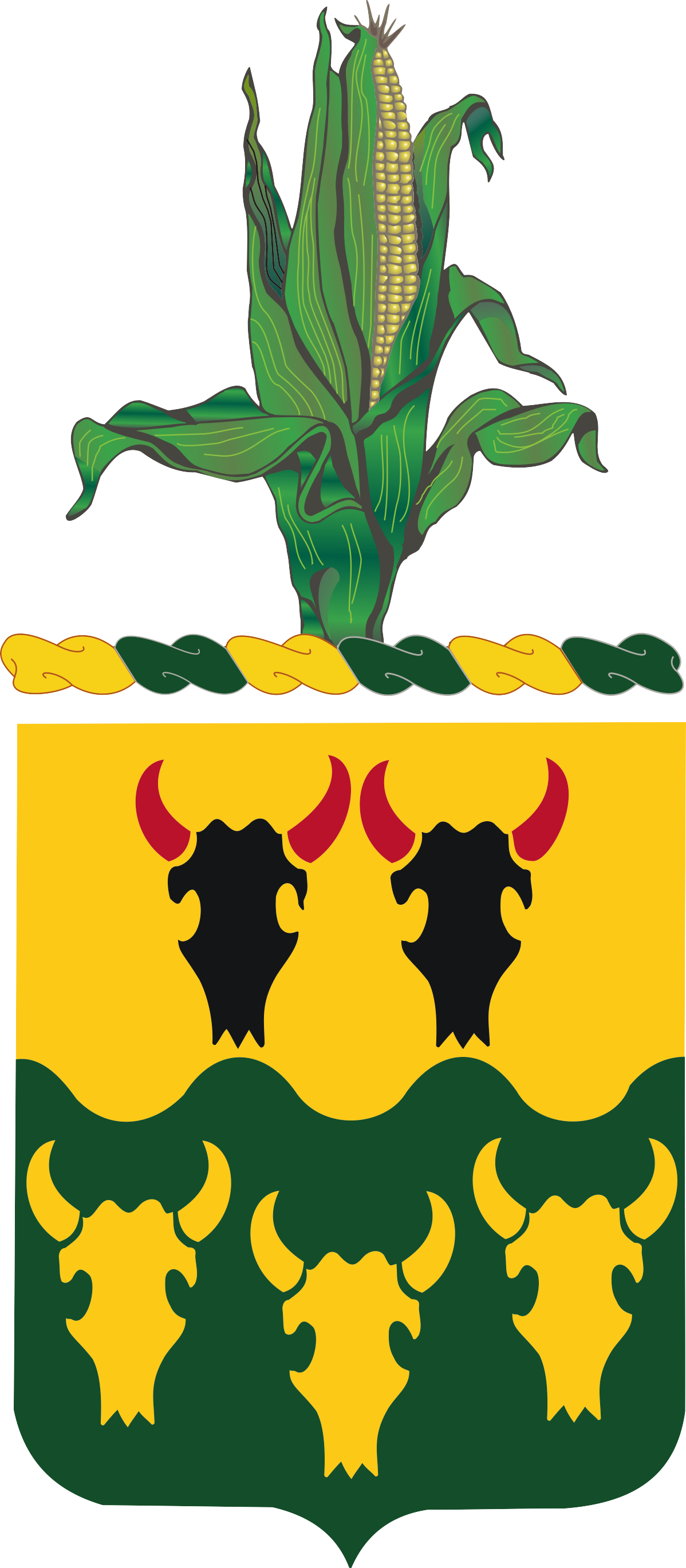
195th Armor
"Prairie Men of Steel"

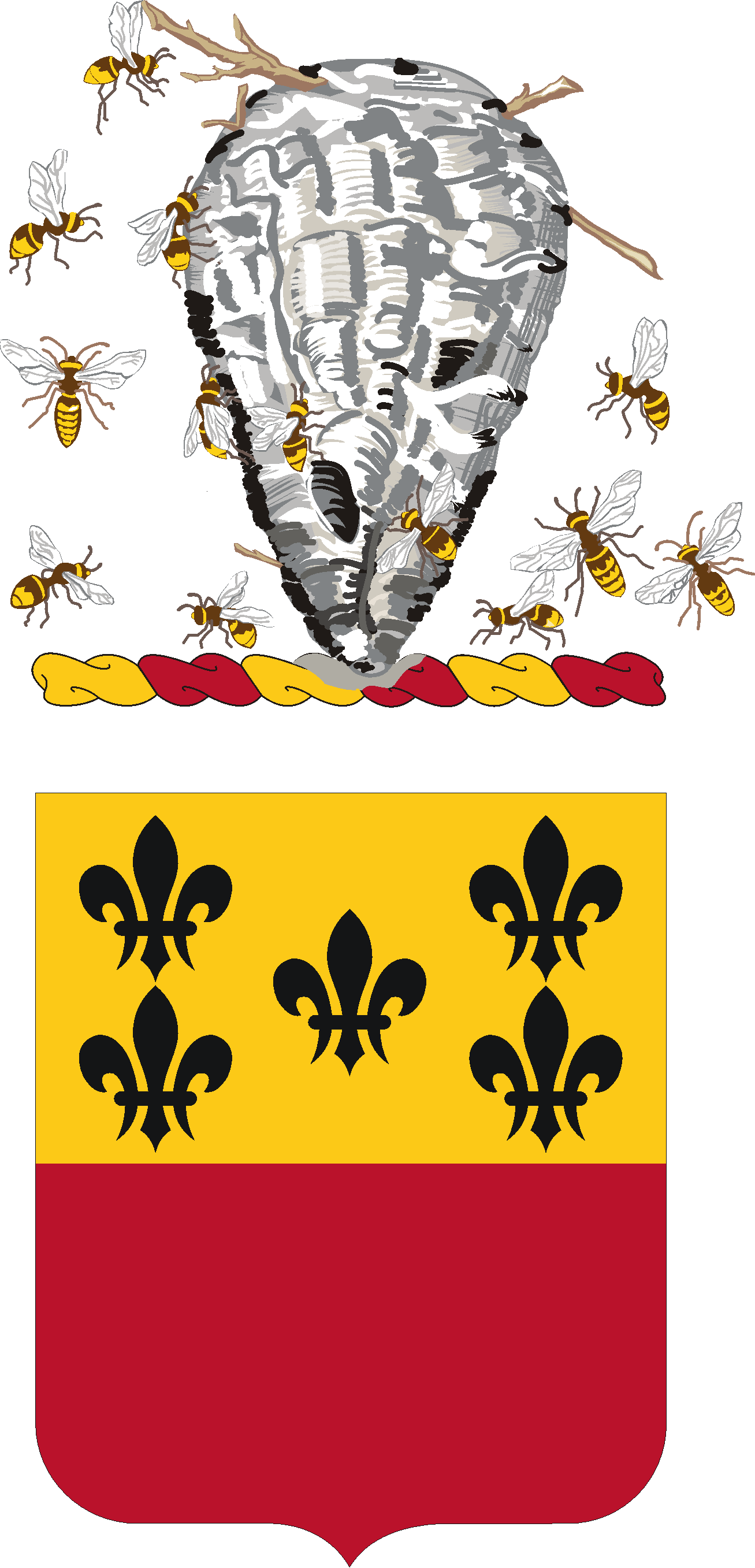
196th Armored
"Able Alert Aggressive"

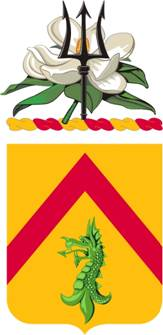
198th Armored
"We Came To Fight"

=== 201 on ===
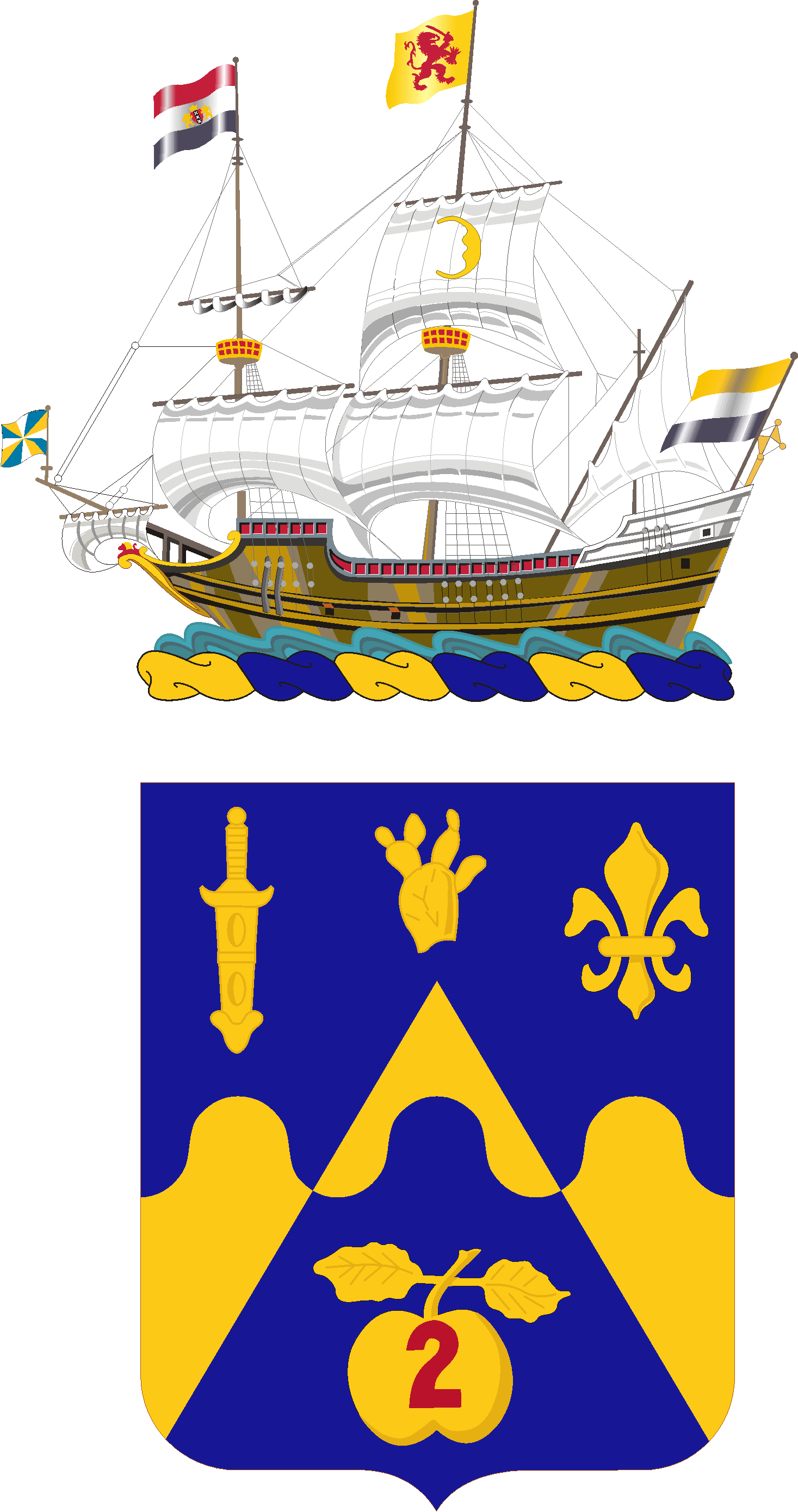
205th Armored
"Virtus Et Fortitude" (Courage and Fortitude)

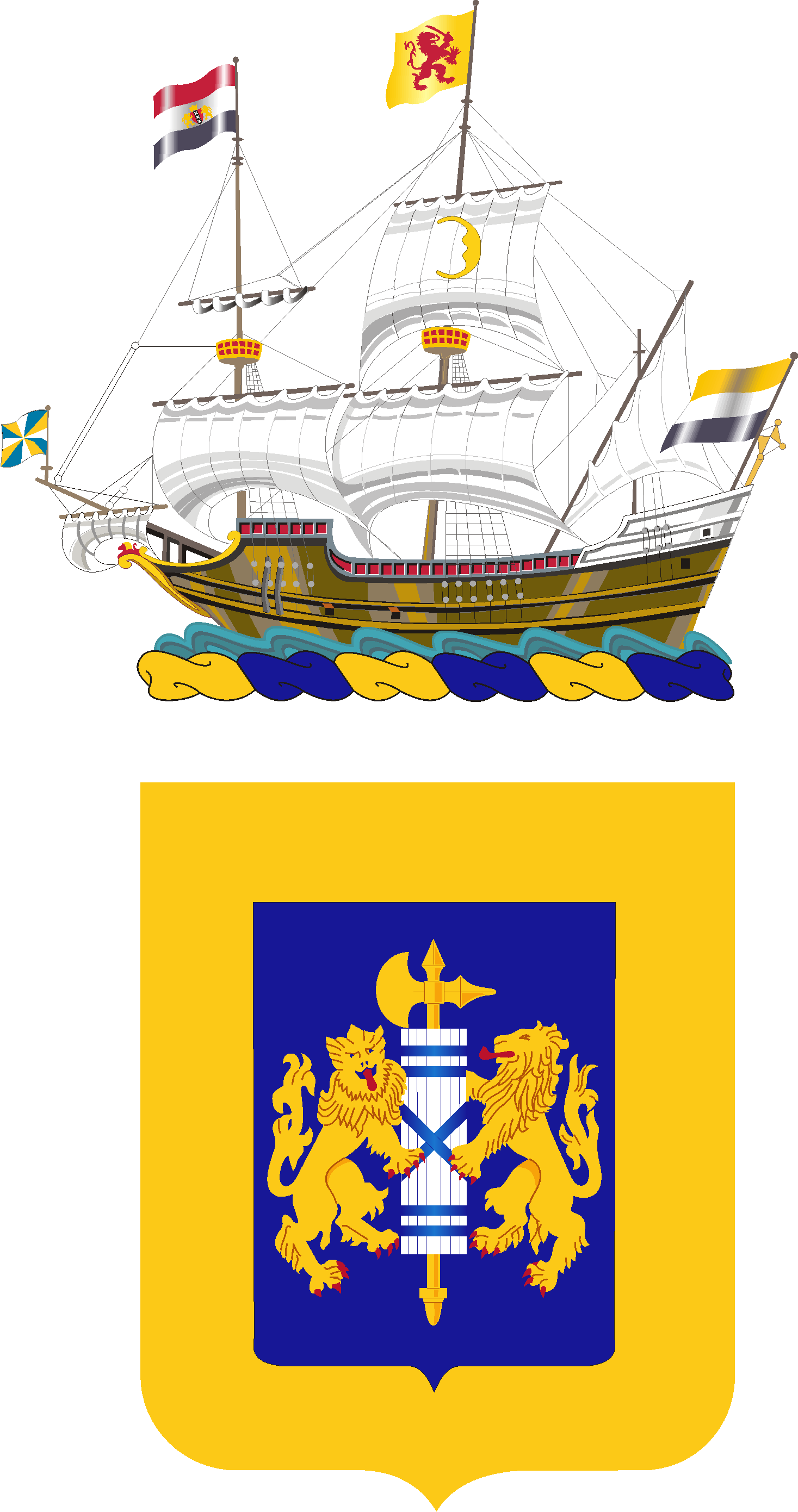
208th Armored
"Might for Right"

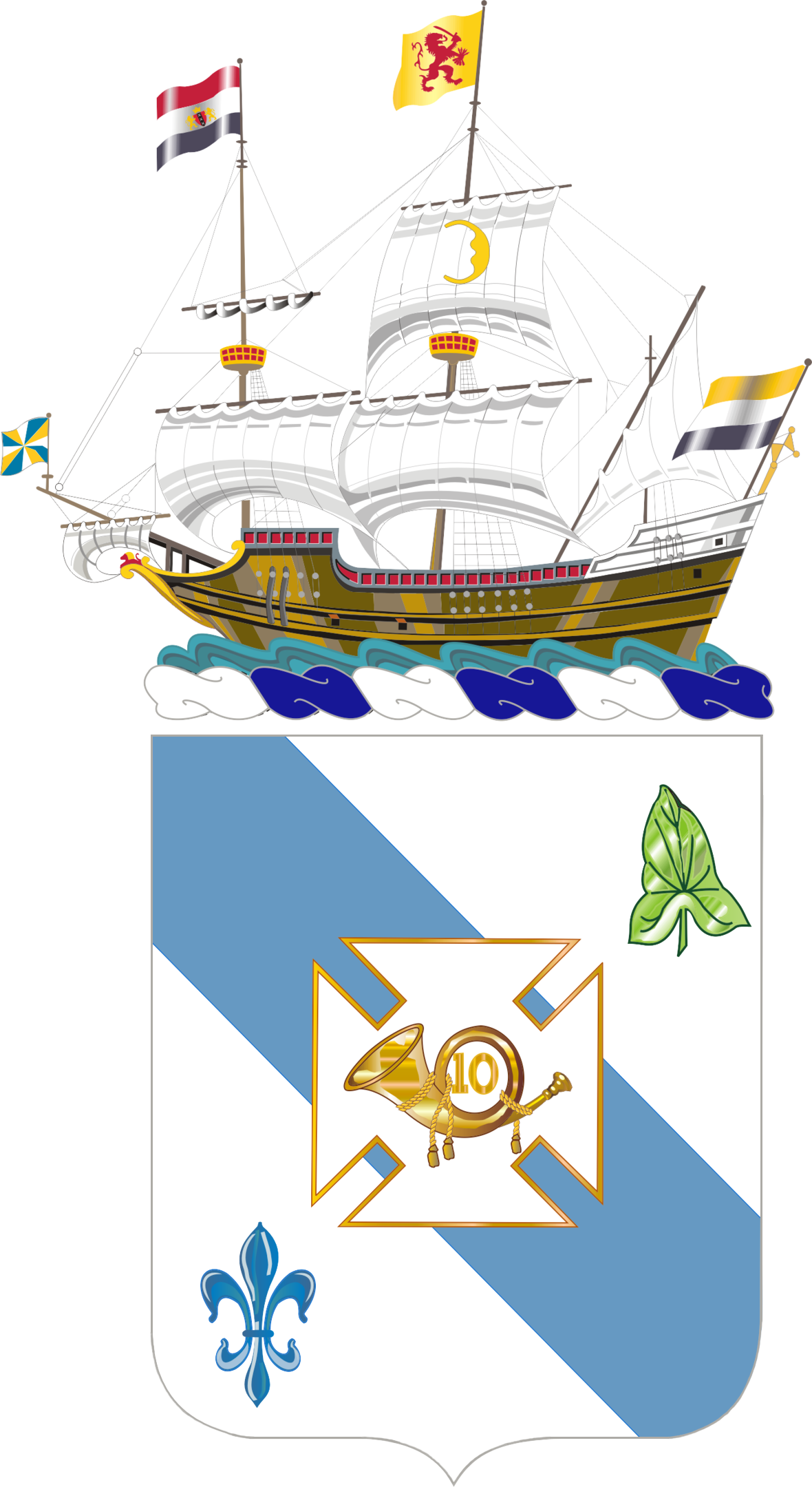
210th Armored
"Ducit Amor Patriae" (Led by Love of Country)

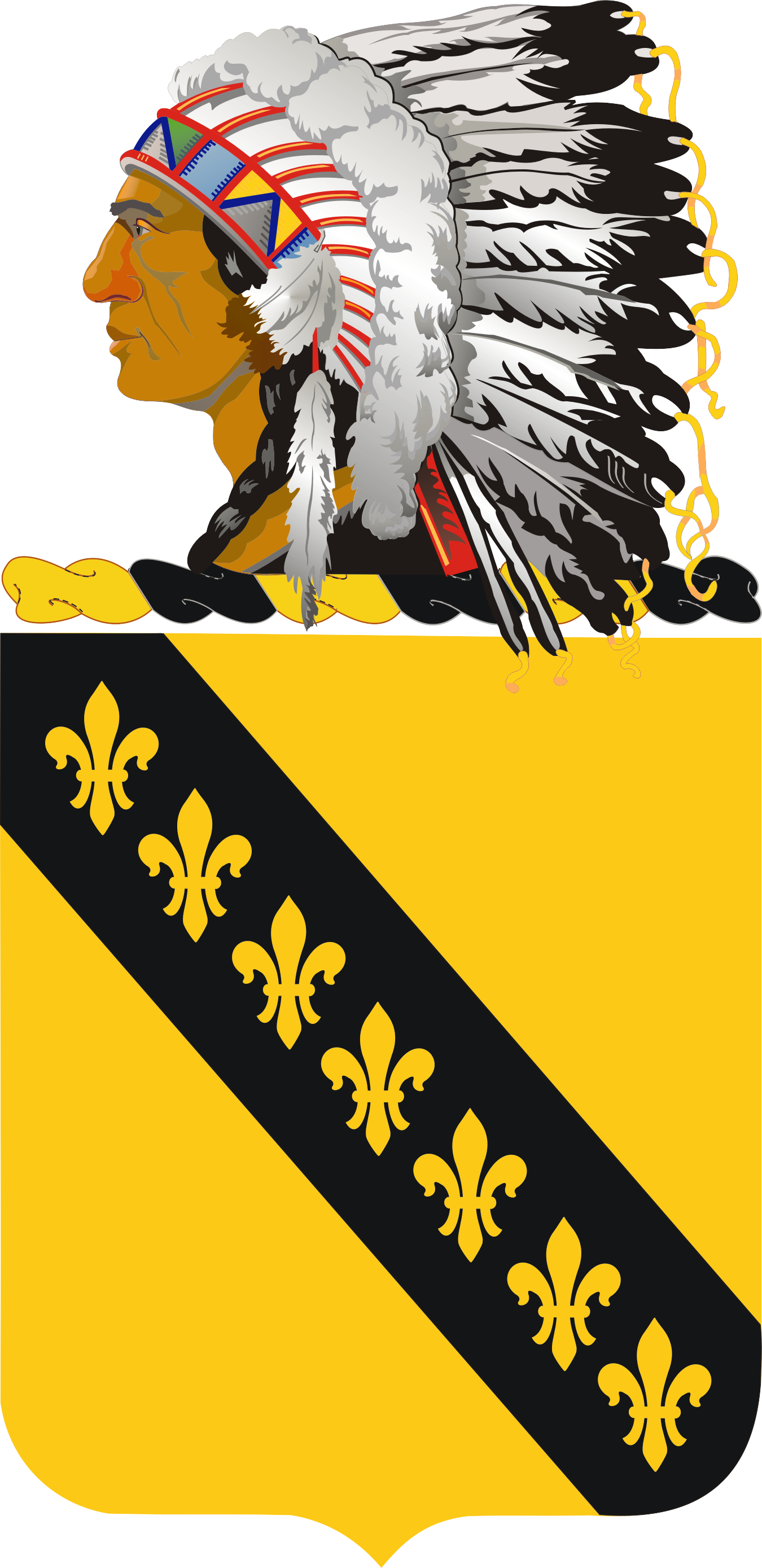
245th Armored
"Rolling Thunder"

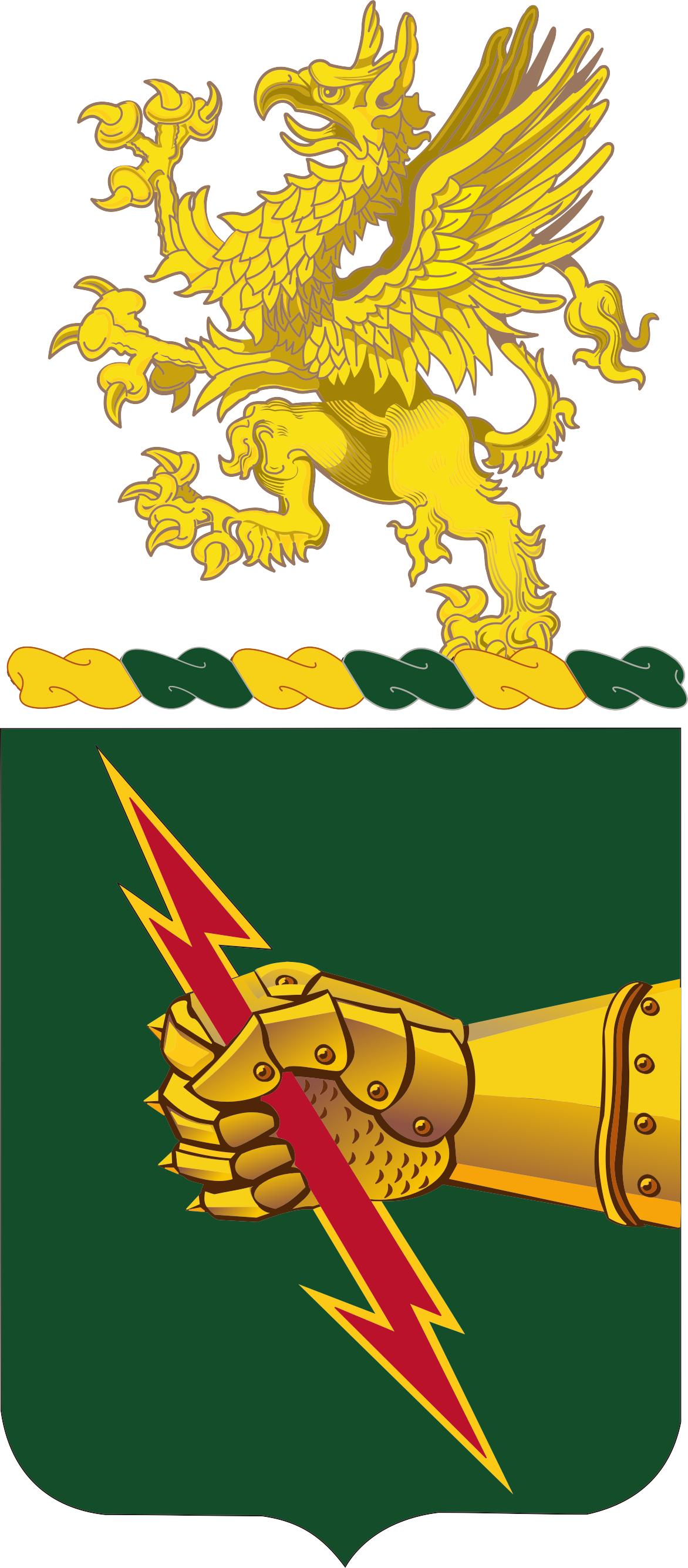
246th Armor
"Mailed Thunder"

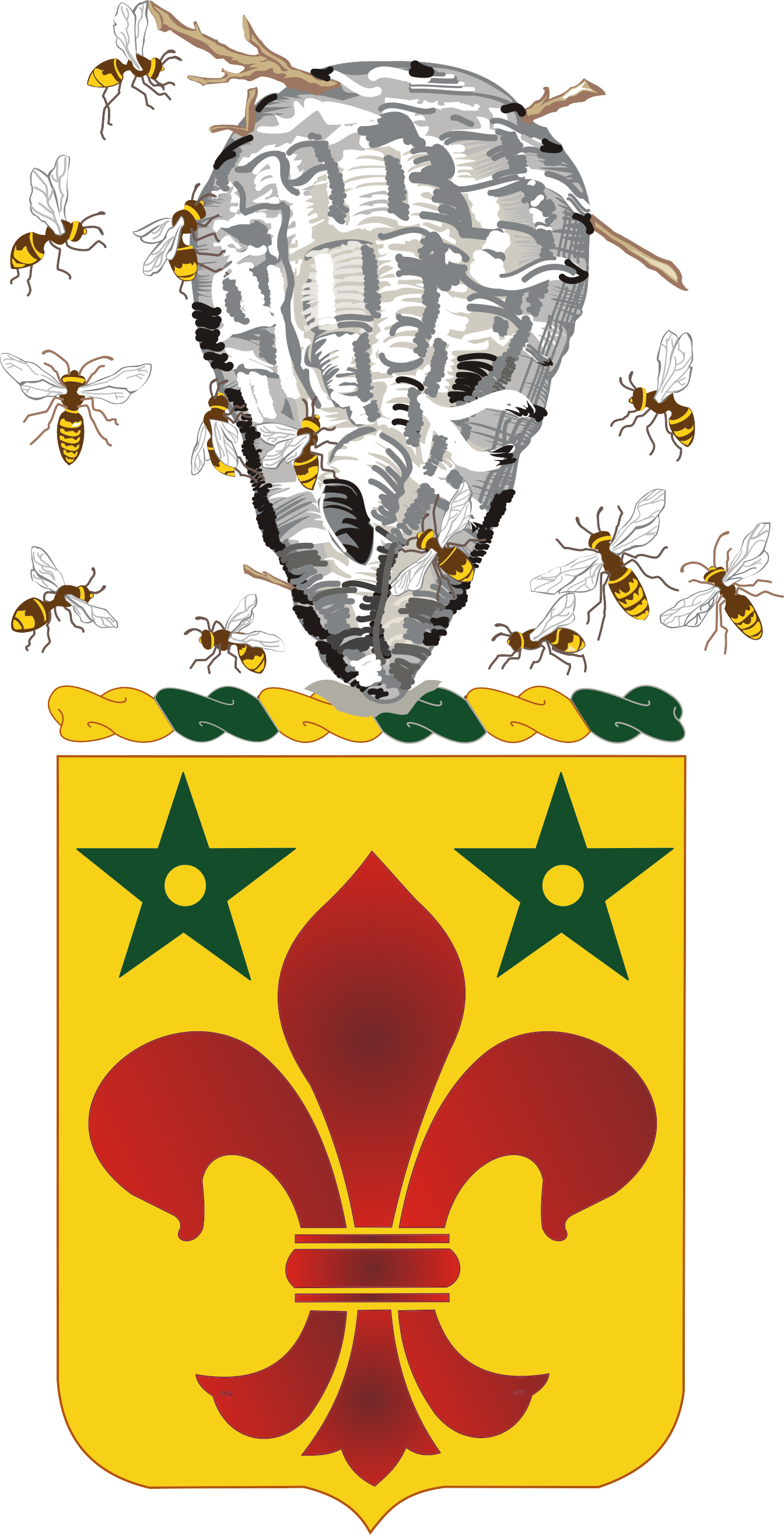
252nd Armored
"Ready Poised Decisive"

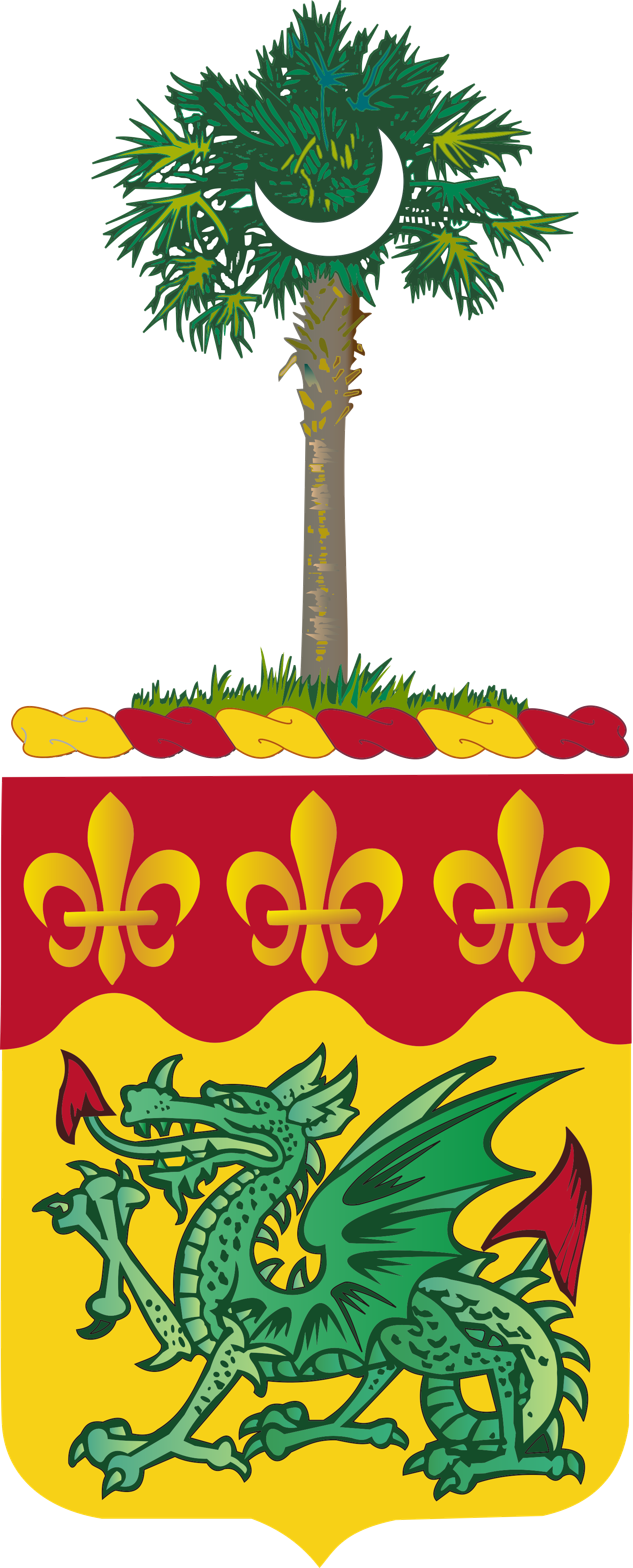
263d Armored
"Never Surrendered"

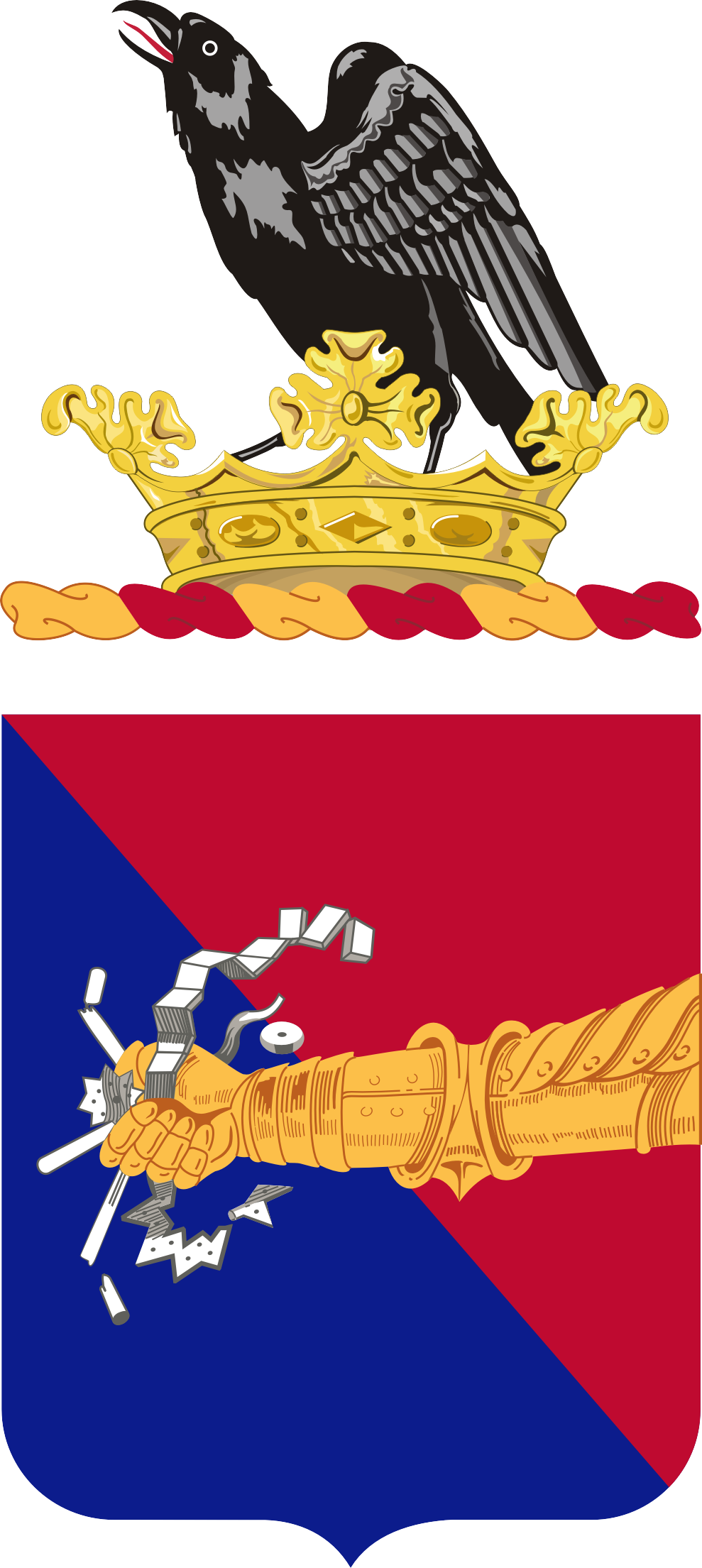
303d Armored
"Fire and Movement"

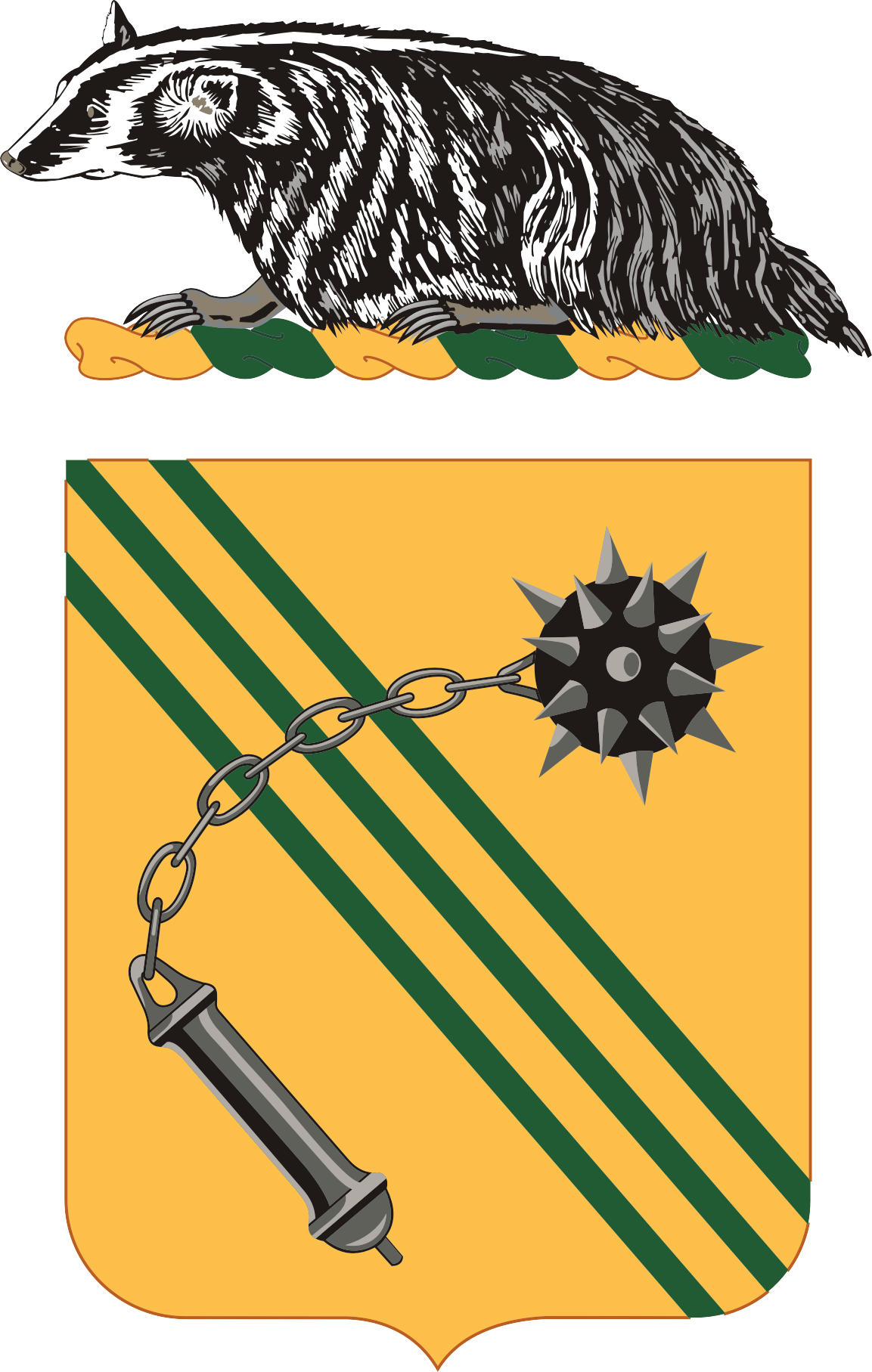
632d Armored
"Age aut Perfice" (Act or Achieve)

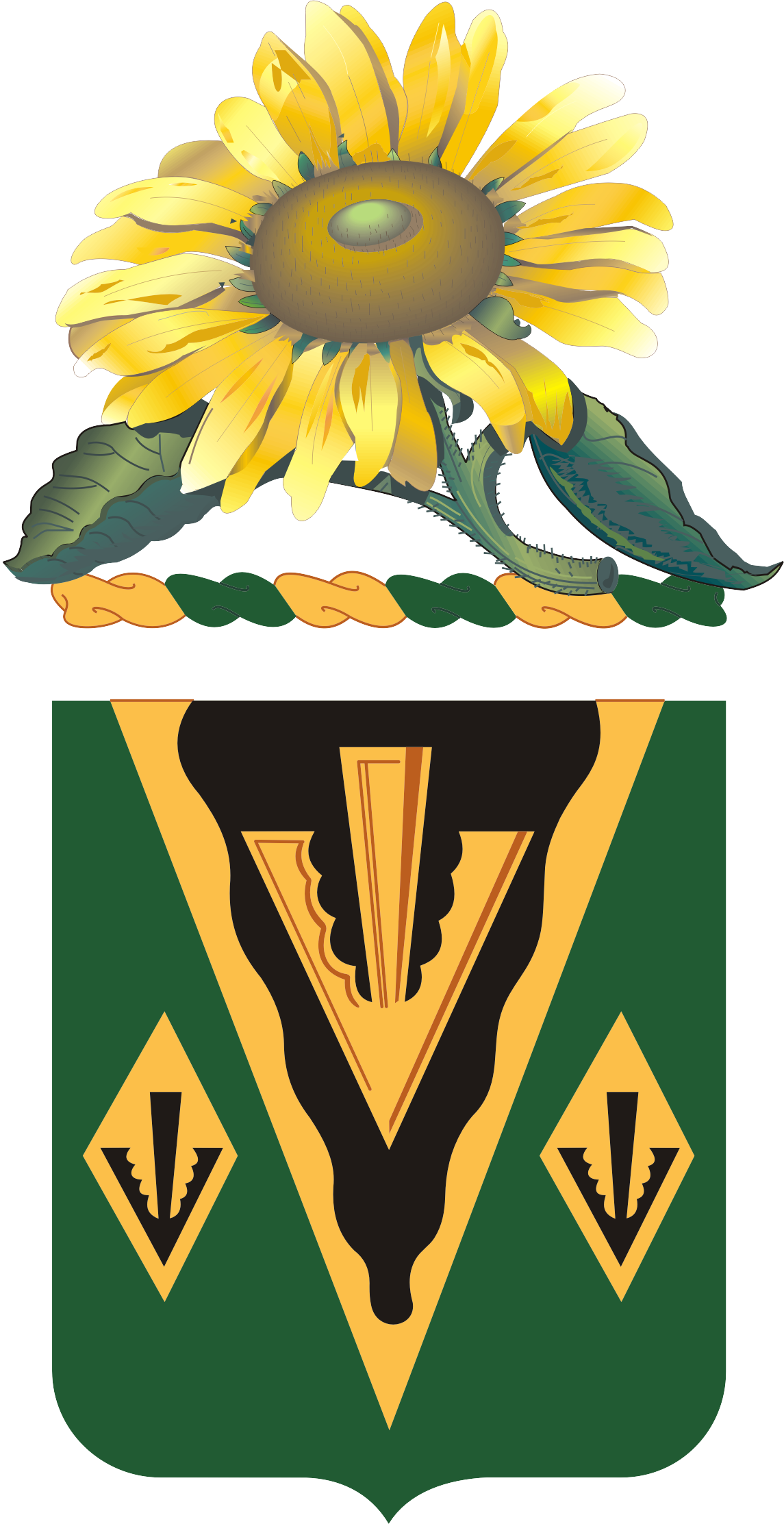
635th Armored
"Will to Win"

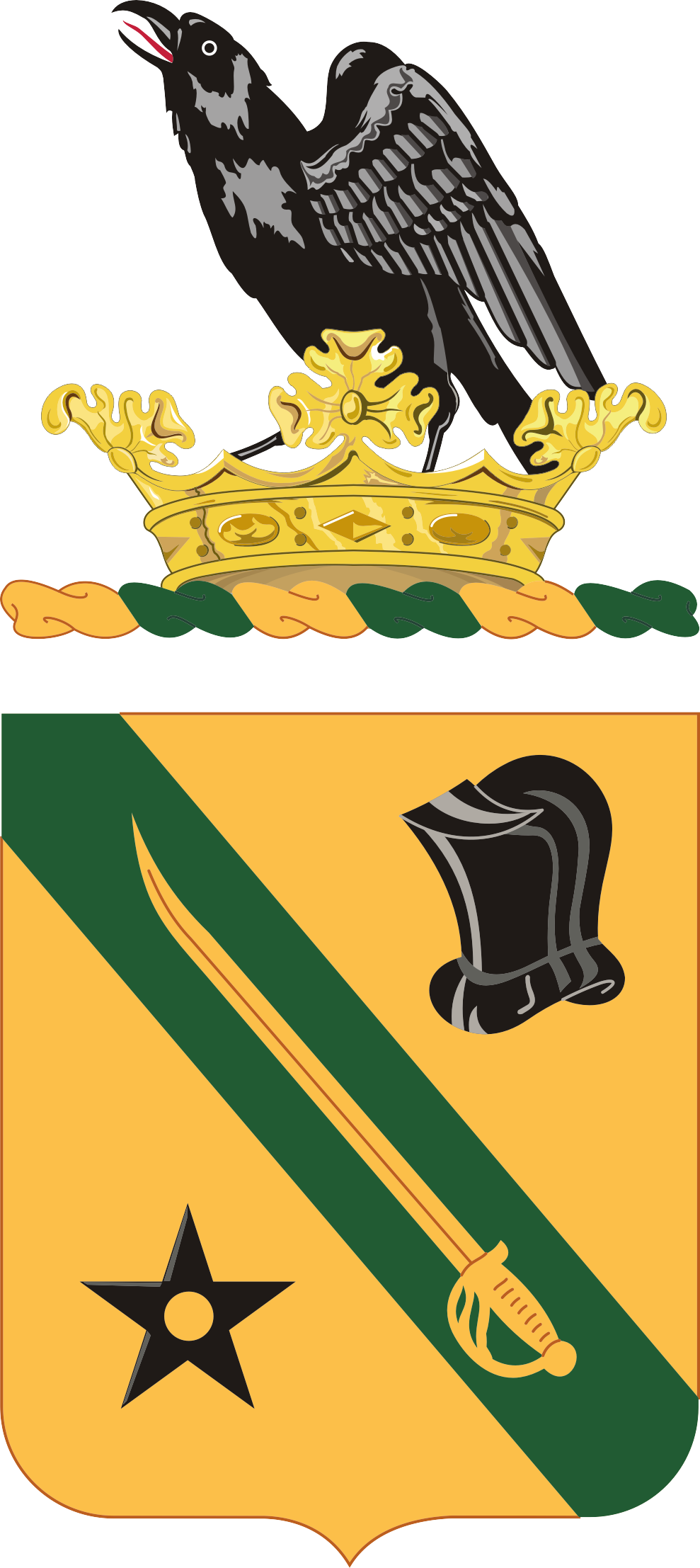
803d Armored
"Yield to Us"

== Field Artillery ==
The coats of arms for artillery units normally incorporate the color red, which has been the traditional color of the Artillery Branch in the US Army since the formation of the Corps of Artillery in 1777. In 1917 the numbers from 1 through 100 were reserved for the Regular Army, from 101 through 300 for the National Guard, and 301 and above for the National Army. Under this system the 1st through 21st and 76th through 83d were organized in the Regular Army; the 101st through 151st, in the National Guard; and the 301st through 351st, plus the 25th through 75th and the 84th and 85th, in the National Army. Several numbers in national guard units have been "reused" so that its possible to have two units with same number, but at different time periods.

=== 1 to 100 ===
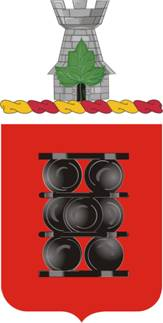
1st Field Artillery
"Primus Ut Nullus" (First or Not at All)

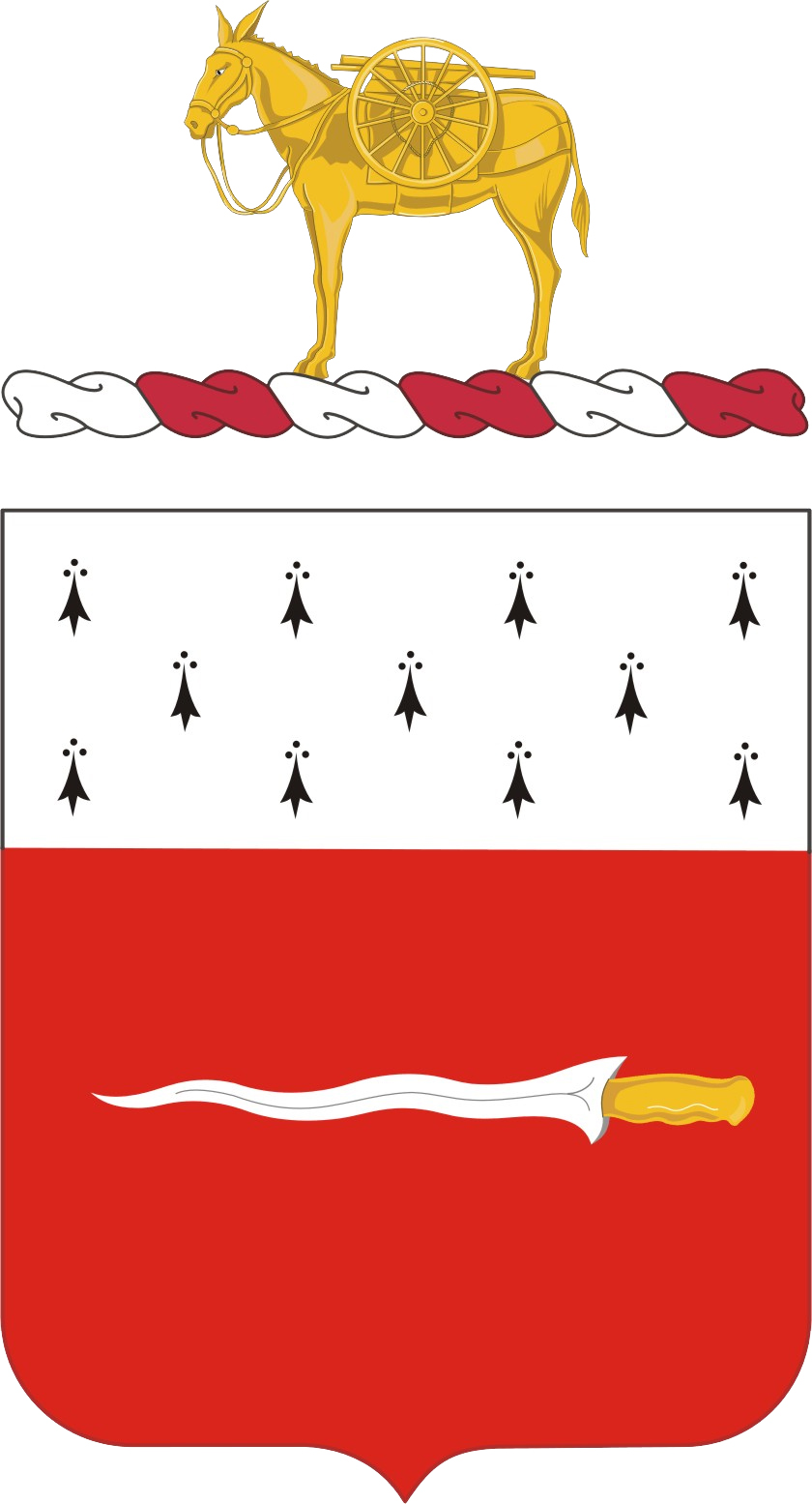
2nd Field Artillery
"The Second First"

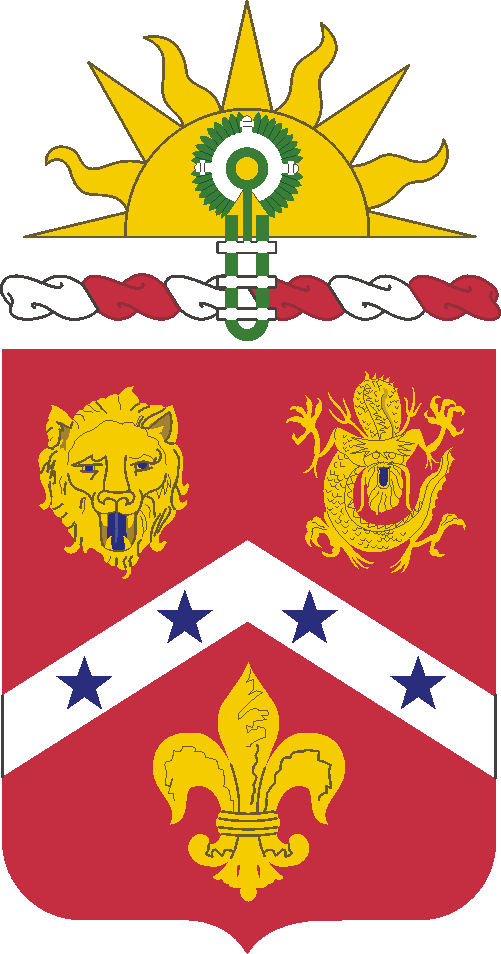
3rd Field Artillery
"Celeritas Et Accuratio" (Speed and Accuracy)

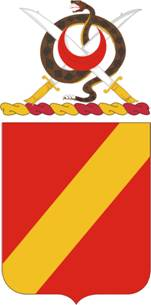
4th Field Artillery
"Nulli Vestigia Retrorsum" (No Step Backward)

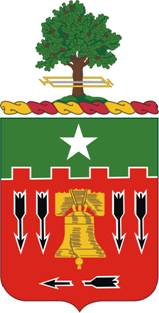
5th Field Artillery
"Faithful and True"

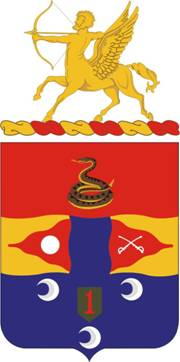
6th Field Artillery
"Celer et Audax" (Swift and Bold)

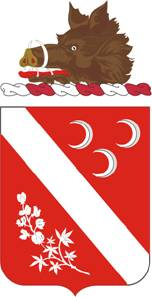
7th Field Artillery
"Numquam Aerumna Nec Proeilo Fractum" (Never Broken By Hardship or Battle)

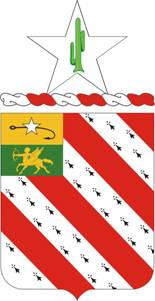
8th Field Artillery
"Audacieux Et Tenace" (Daring and Tenacius)

9th Field Artillery
"Kulia-i-ka-nuu" (Strive to Reach the Summit)

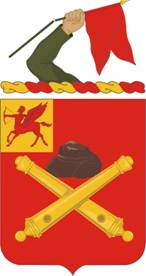
10th Field Artillery
"The Rock's Support"

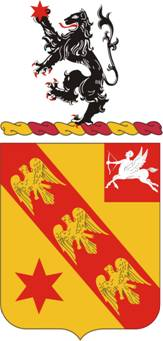
11th Field Artillery
"On Time"

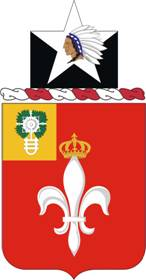
12th Field Artillery
"Nec Temere Nec Timide" (Neither Rashly nor Timidly)

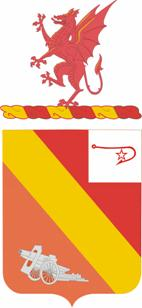
13th Field Artillery
"Without Fear, Favor or the Hope of Reward"

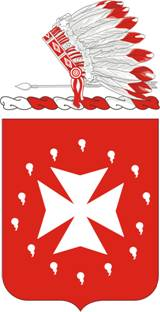
14th Field Artillery
"Ex Hoc Signo Victoria" (In This Sign Victory)

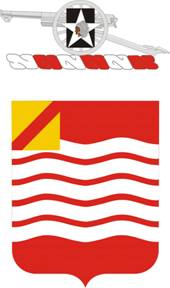
15th Field Artillery
"Allons"

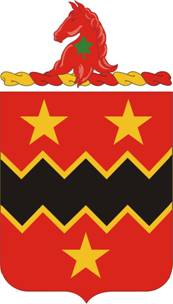
16th Field Artillery
"Macte Nova Virtute" (Go Forth With New Strength)

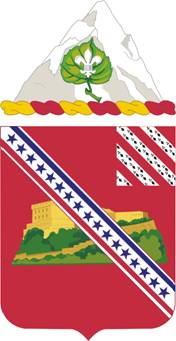
17th Field Artillery
"In Time of Peace Prepare for War"

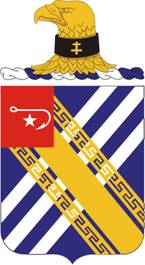
18th Field Artillery
"Per Aspera Ad Astra" (Through Difficulties to the Stars)

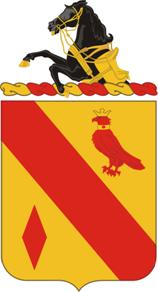
19th Field Artillery
"Per Scintillam Flamma" (Through The Spark, The Flame)

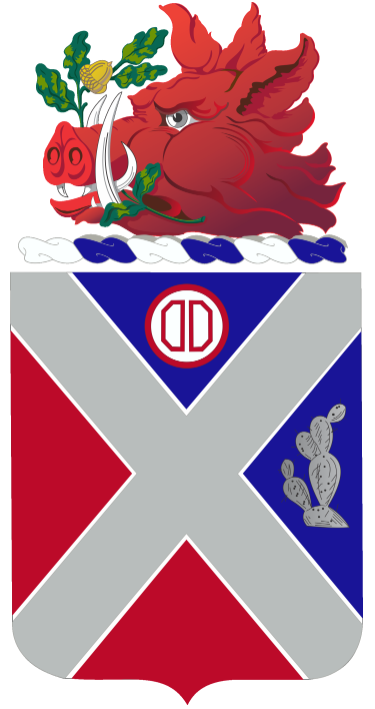
20th Field Artillery
"Duty Not Reward"

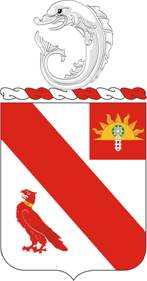
21st Field Artillery
"Progressi Sunt" (They Have Advanced)

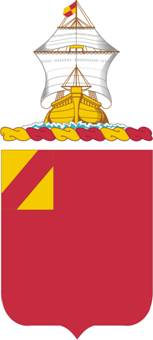
22nd Field Artillery
"Labore et Honore" (With Industry and Honor)

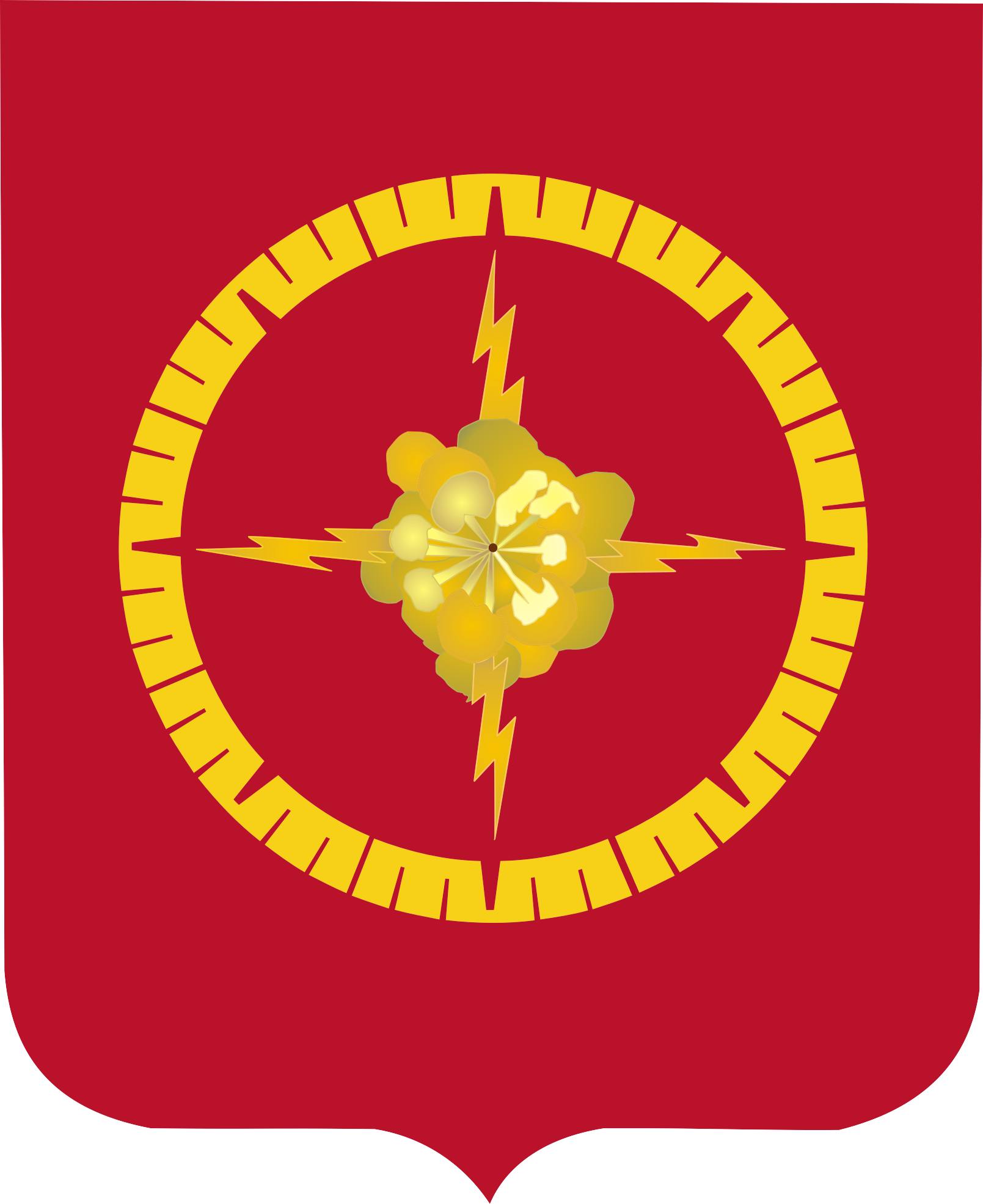
23rd Field Artillery

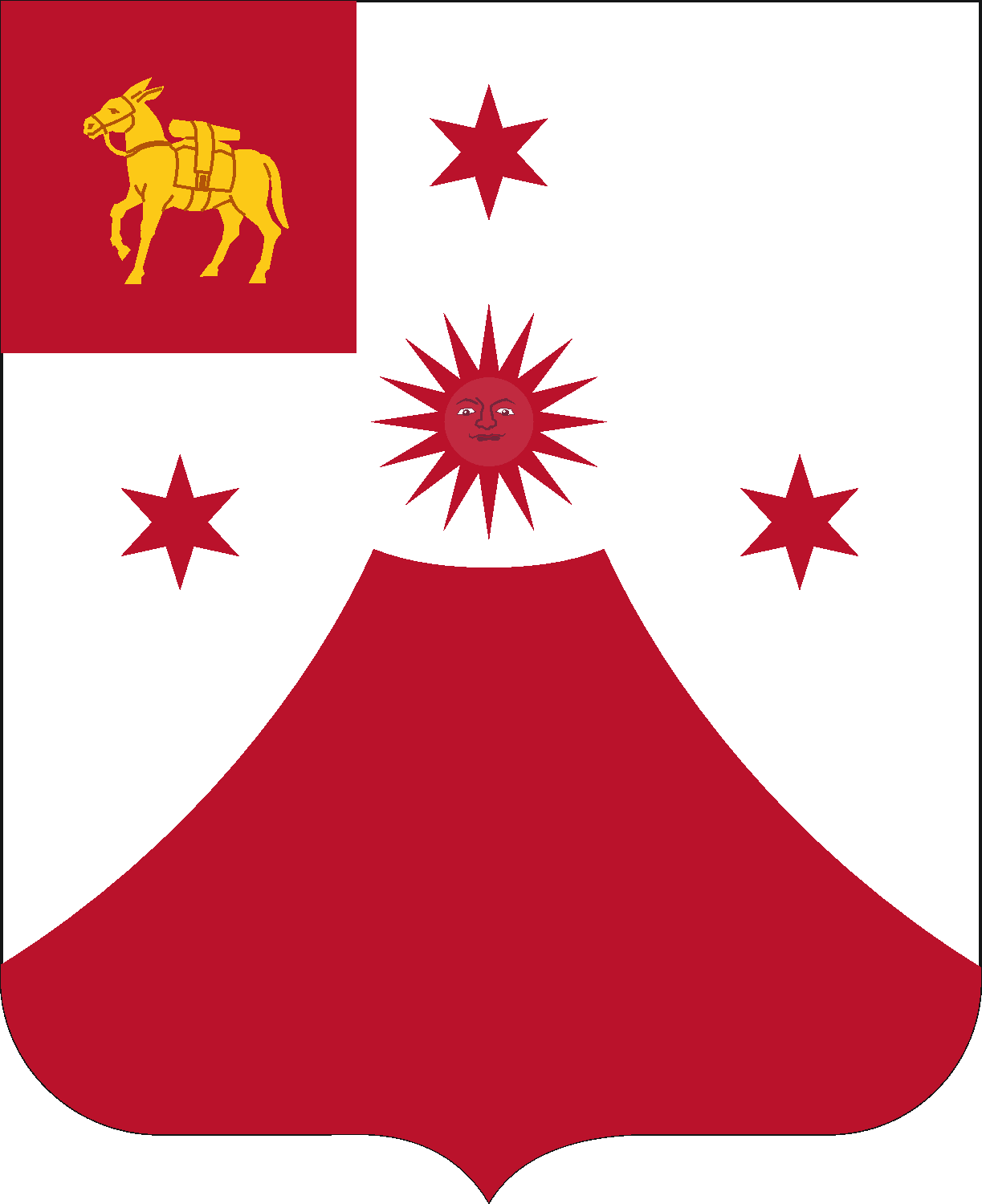
24th Field Artillery
"Crescit sub ponders Virtu" (Virtue increases under a load)

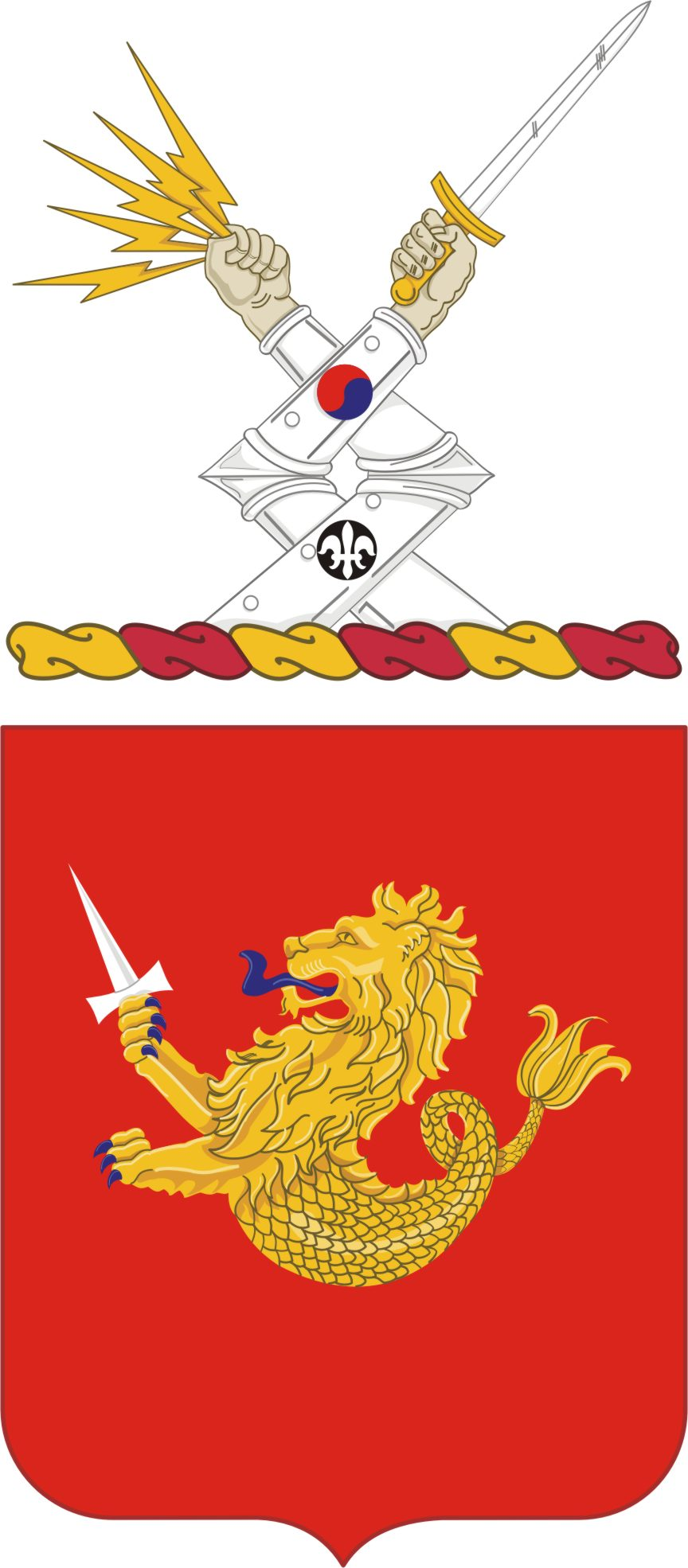
25th Field Artillery
"Tace et Face" (Be Silent and Act)

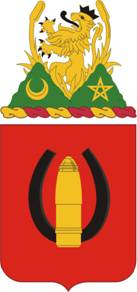
26th Field Artillery
"Courage and Action"

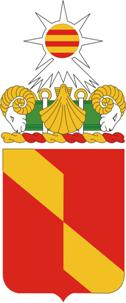
27th Field Artillery
"Conjuncti Stamus" (United We Stand)

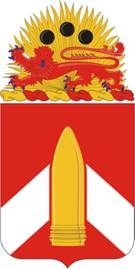
28th Field Artillery
"We Support the Line"

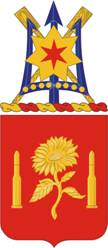
29th Field Artillery
"Fidelis Et Verus" (Faithful and True)

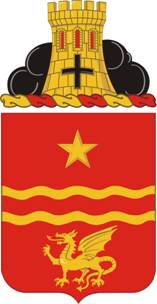
30th Field Artillery
"Striving to the Highest"

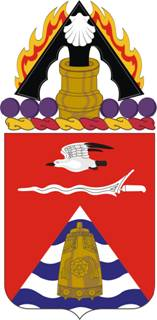
31st Field Artillery
"In Periculo, Nos Jubete" (When in Danger, Command Us)

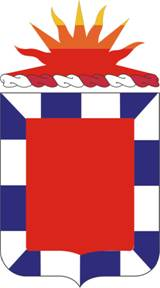
32nd Field Artillery
"Proud Americans"

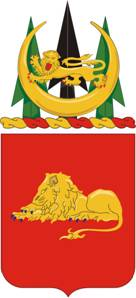
33rd Field Artillery
"Servabo Fidem" (I Will Keep Faith)

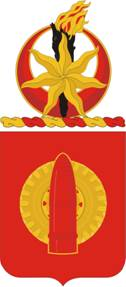
34th Field Artillery
"We Support"

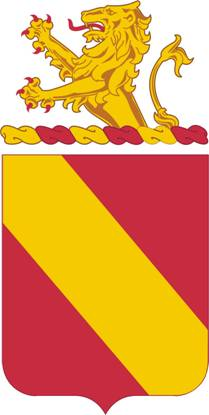
35th Field Artillery
"En Avant Toujours" (Forward Always)

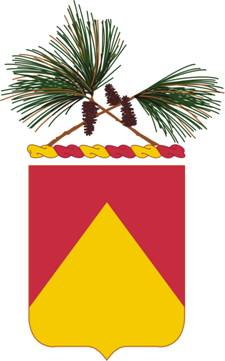
36th Field Artillery
"In Order"

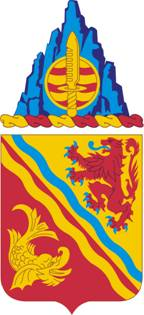
37th Field Artillery
"On the Minute"

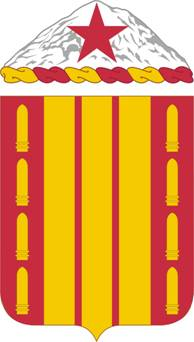
38th Field Artillery
"Steel Behind the Rock"

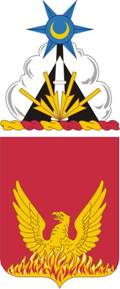
39th Field Artillery
"Celerita in Conficiendo" (Speed in Action)

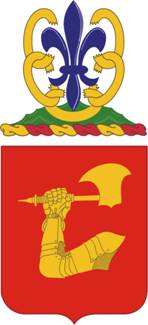
40th Field Artillery
"All for One"

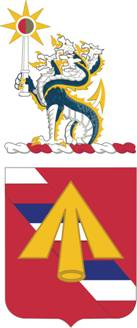
41st Field Artillery
"Mission Accomplished"

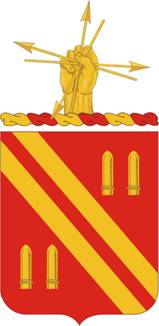
42nd Field Artillery
"Festina Lente" (Make Haste Slowly)

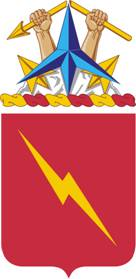
73rd Field Artillery
"Speed and Power Always"

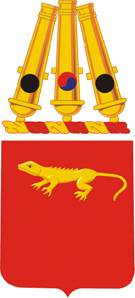
75th Field Artillery
"Paratus Facere" (Prepared to Do)

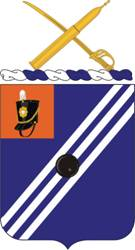
76th Field Artillery
"Duty, the Spirit of '76"

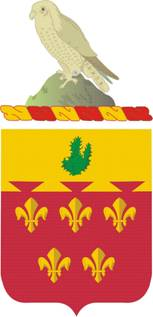
77th Field Artillery
"En Garde" (On Guard)

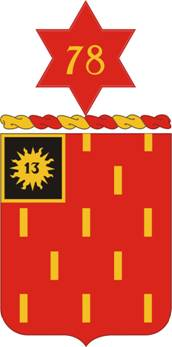
78th Field Artillery
"Semel et Simul" (At Once and Together)

79th Field Artillery
"Our Country-Our Regiment"

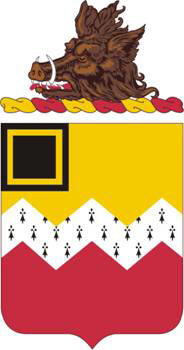
80th Field Artillery
"Toujours L'Audace"

81st Field Artillery
"Libertas Justitia Humanitas"

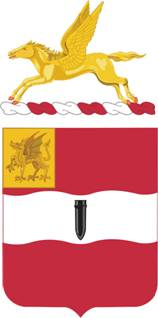
82nd Field Artillery
"Can and Will"

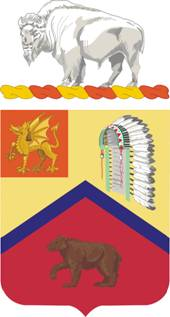
83rd Field Artillery
"Flagrante Bello" (During Hostilities)

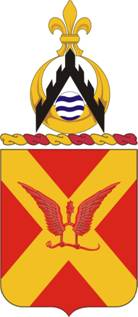
84th Field Artillery
"Performance Above All"

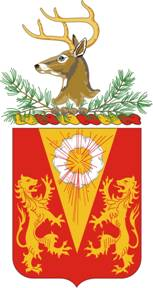
86th Field Artillery (former 124th Field Artillery)
"Hic Murus Aheneus" (This Is a Brazen Wall)

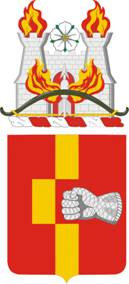
92nd Field Artillery
"Brave Cannons"

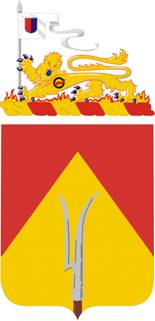
94th Field Artillery
"Flexible"

=== 101 to 200 ===
101st Field Artillery
"Vincere Est Vivere" (To Conquer is to Live)

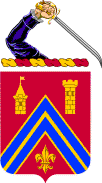
102nd Field Artillery
"Sic Itur Ad Astra" (This Is the Way to the Stars)

103rd Field Artillery
"Play the Game"

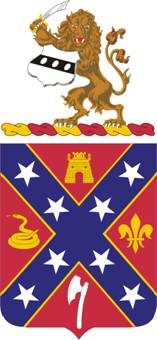
107th Field Artillery
"Gettysburg to the Marne"

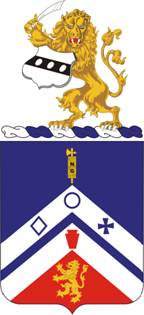
108th Field Artillery
"Non Sibi, Sed Patriae" (Not Self, But Country)

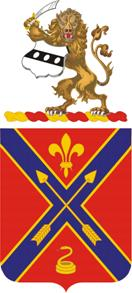
109th Field Artillery
"En Avant" (Forward)

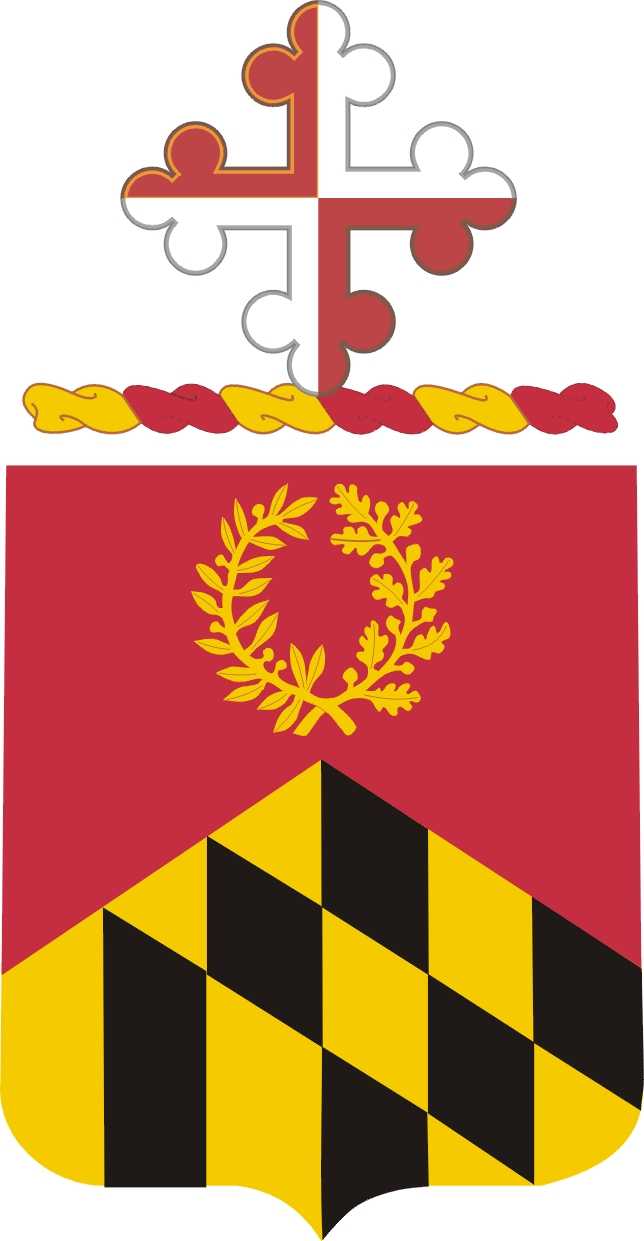
110th Field Artillery
Sicut Quercus (As The Oak)

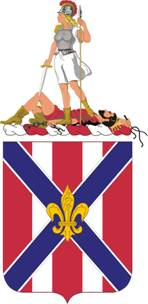
111th Field Artillery
"Nunquam Non Paratus" (Never Unprepared)

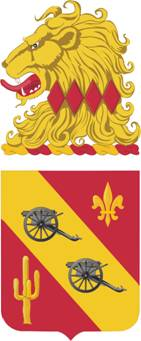
112th Field Artillery
"A Outrance" (To The Utmost)

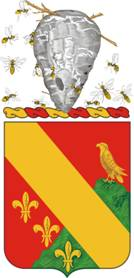
113th Field Artillery
"Carry On"

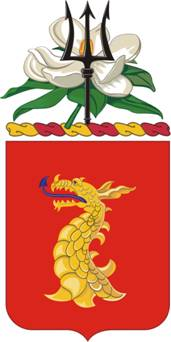
114th Field Artillery
"Ad Summa Virtus" (Courage to the Last)

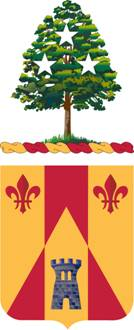
115th Field Artillery
"Ever on Call"

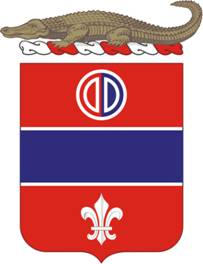
116th Field Artillery
"Vestigia Nulla Retrosum" (There Is No Going Back)

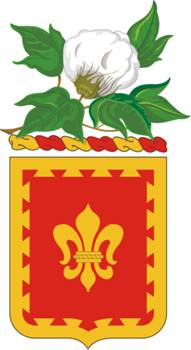
117th Field Artillery
"Parati Armis" (Ready at the Guns)

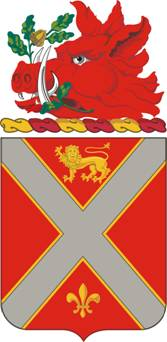
118th Field Artillery
"Nescit Cedere" (He Knows No Surrender)

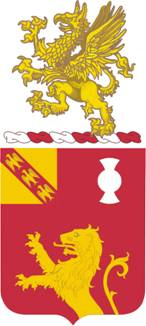
119th Field Artillery
"Viam Praeparamus" (We Prepare the Way)

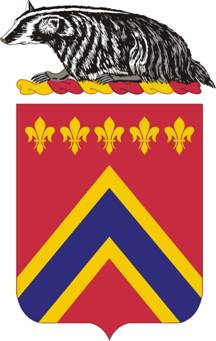
120th Field Artillery
"Eager to Assist"

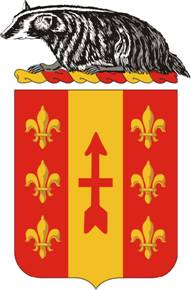
121st Field Artillery
"Catervae Ferreae" (Of The Brigade of Iron)

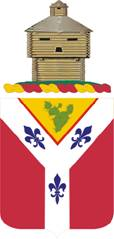
122nd Field Artillery
"Prompti et Parati" (Prepared and Willing)

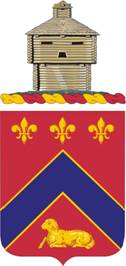
123rd Field Artillery
""Parati et Volentes" (Ready and Willing)

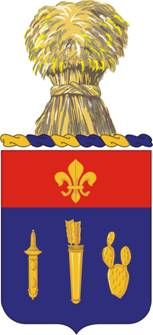
125th Field Artillery
"Faithful"

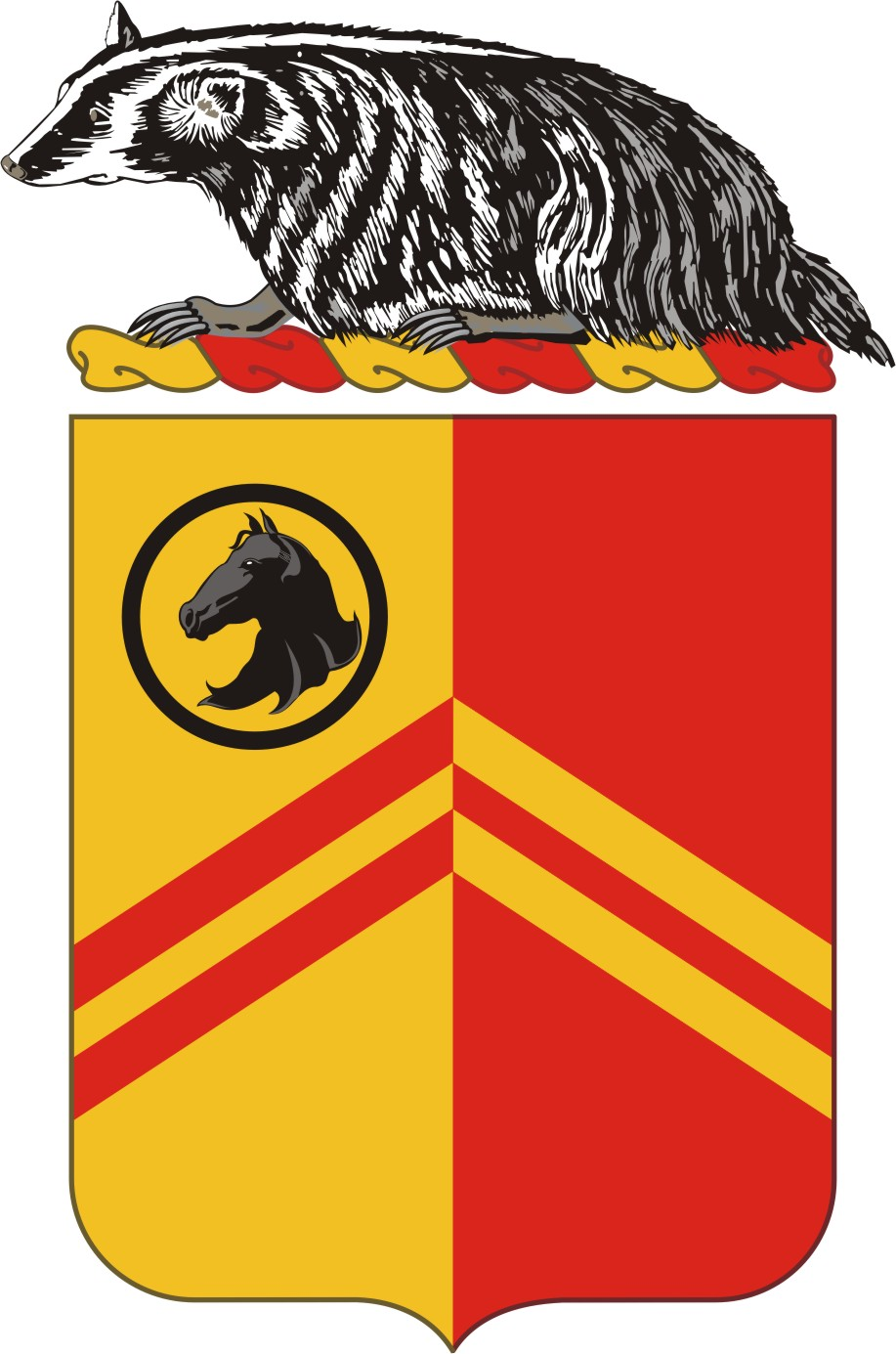
126th Field Artillery
"Follow Me"

127th Field Artillery
"Via Vi" (A Way By Force)

128th Field Artillery
"Show Me"

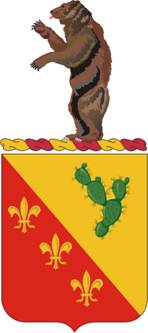
129th Field Artillery
"Send Your Mission"

130th Field Artillery
"Semper Parvo Meliores" (Always a Little Better)

131st Field Artillery
"We Play The Game"

133rd Field Artillery
"Dum Spiramus Tuebimur" (While We Breathe, We Shall Defend)

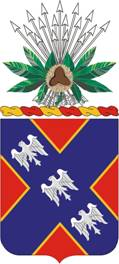
134th Field Artillery
"Faithful and Bold"

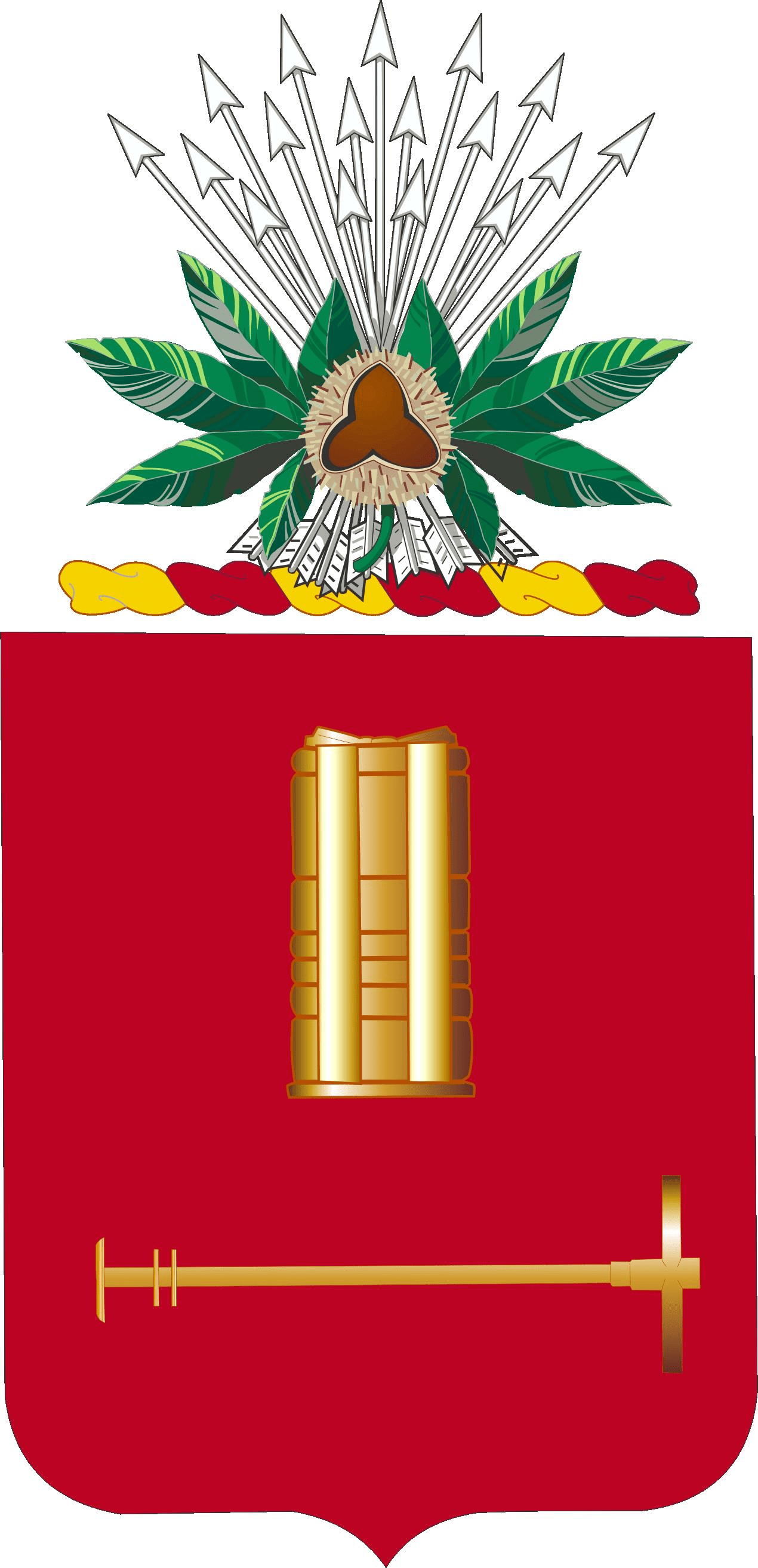
136th Field Artillery
"Push On"

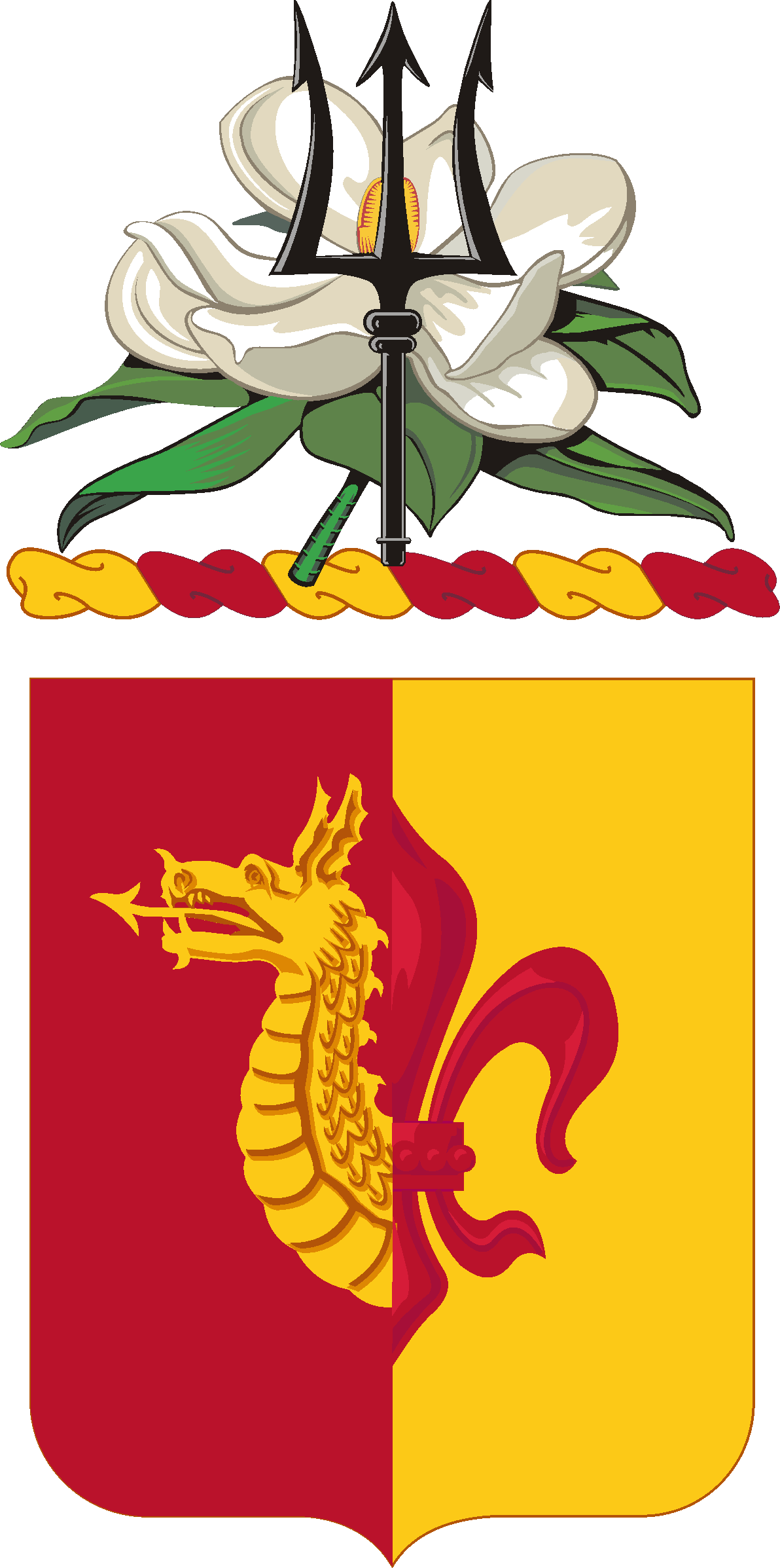
137th Field Artillery
Courageous and ready

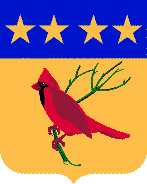
138th Field Artillery
"Arma Parato Fero" (I Carry Arms In Readiness)

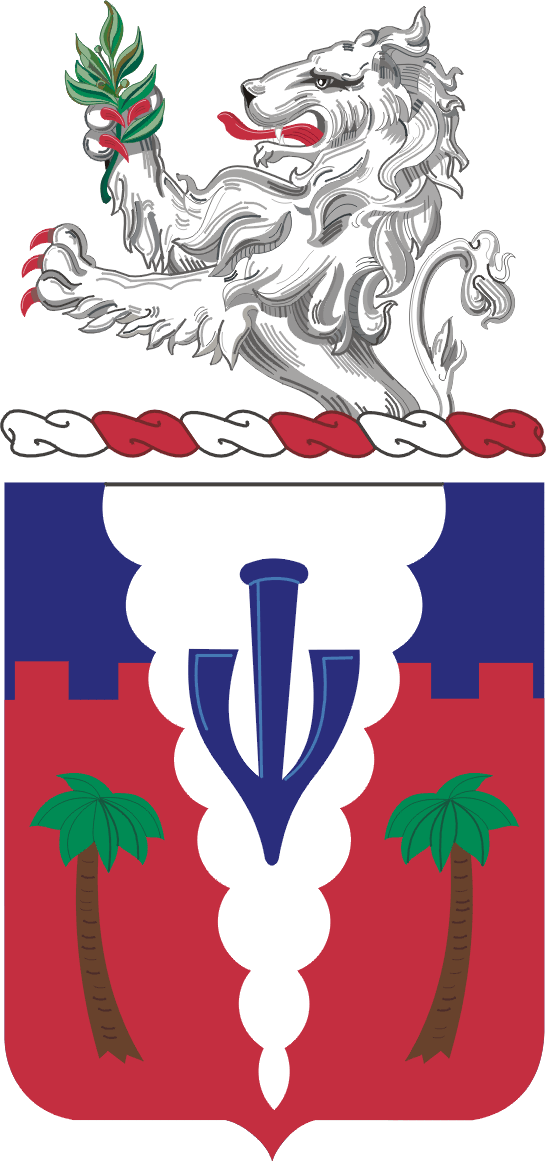
139th Field Artillery
"Arma Pacis Fulcra" (Arms are the Supporters of Peace)

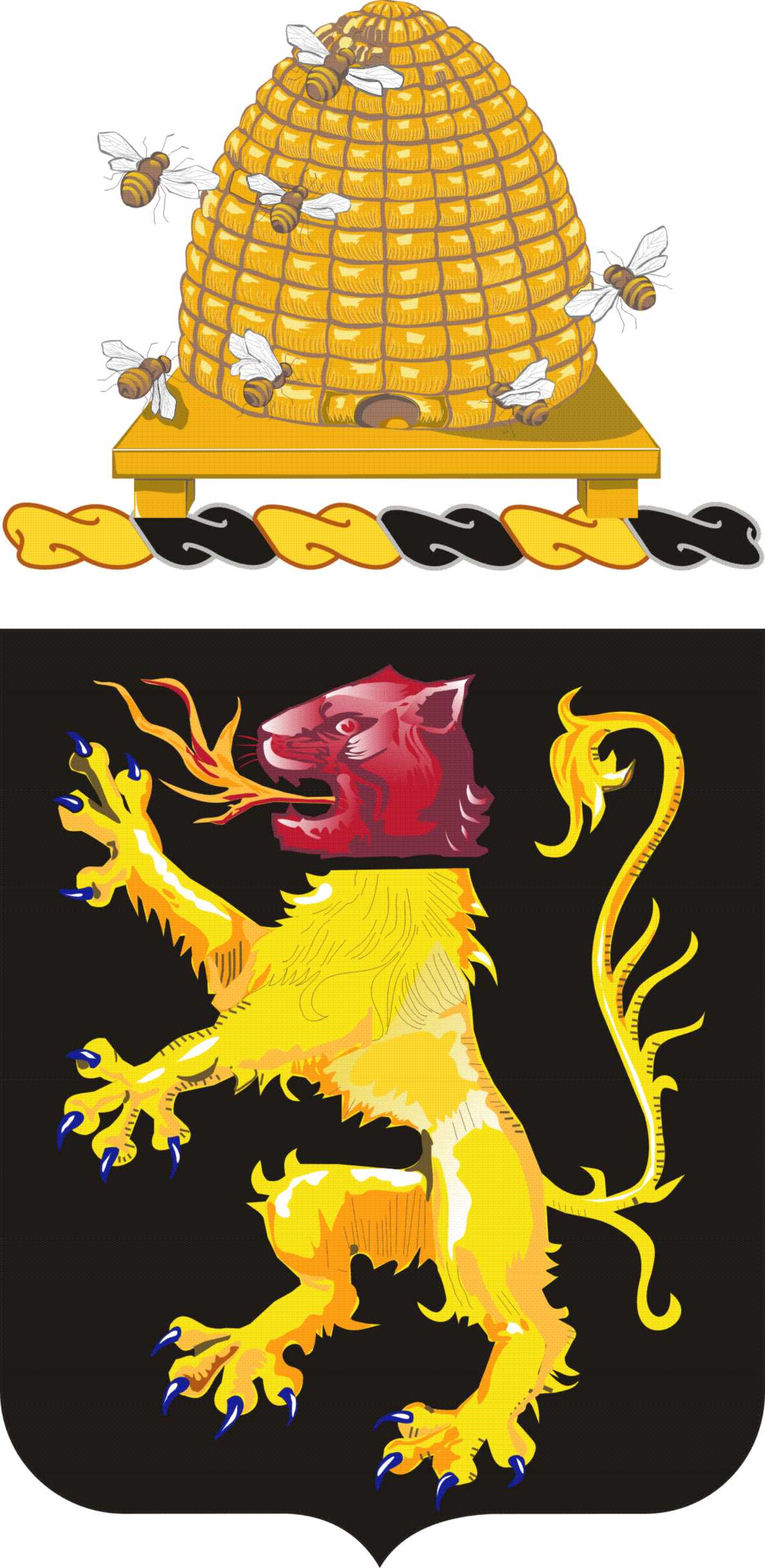
140th Field Artillery
"Igne Et Ferris Vicimus" (We Conquered By Fire And Swords)

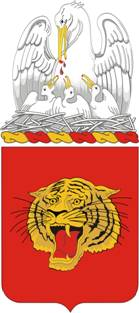
141st Field Artillery
"Try Us"

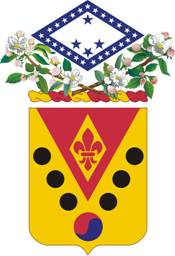
142nd Field Artillery
"Try to stop us!"

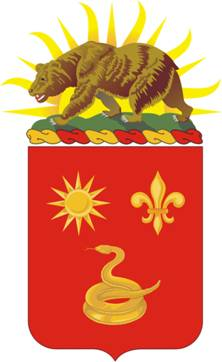
143rd Field Artillery
"Facta Non Verba" (Deeds Not Words)

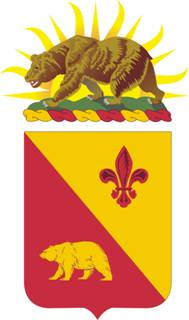
144th Field Artillery
"Contendimus" (We Strive)

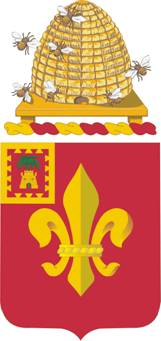
145th Field Artillery
"Pro Deo, Pro Patria" (For God, For Country)

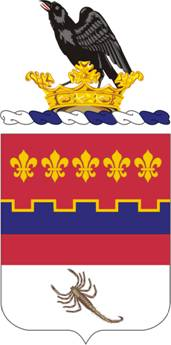
146th Field Artillery
"Action Front"

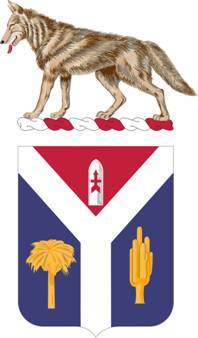
147th Field Artillery
"Prêt et Volontiers" (Ready and Willing)

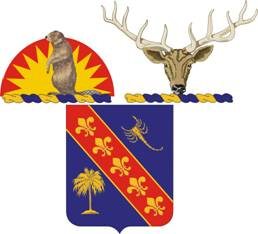
148th Field Artillery
"Whenever, Wherever"

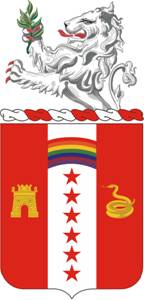
150th Field Artillery
"Fide et Virtute" (With Faith and Valour)

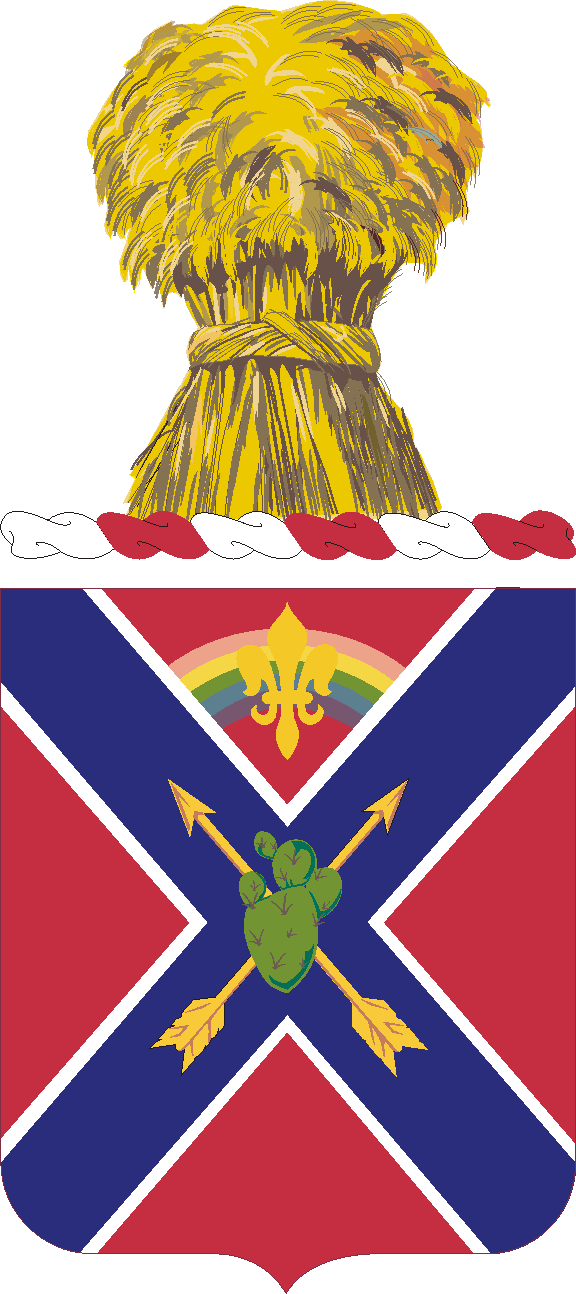
151st Field Artillery
"En Avant" (Forward)

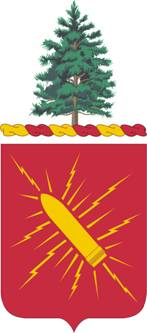
152nd Field Artillery
"On The Way"

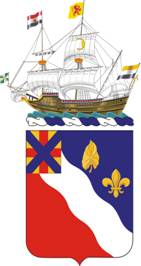
156th Field Artillery
"Semper Procedamus" (Ever Onward)

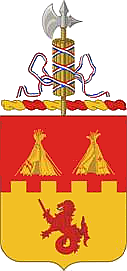
157th Field Artillery
(formerly 157th Infantry)
"Eager for Duty"

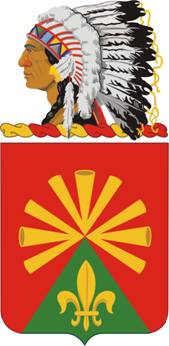
158th Field Artillery
"Unusual Efforts Expended"

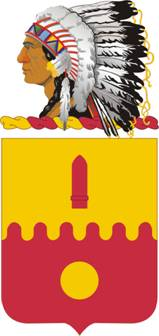
160th Field Artillery
"Toujours en Avant" (Always Forward)

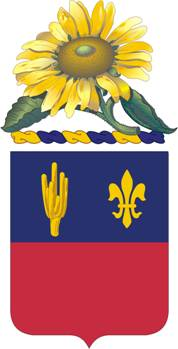
161st Field Artillery
"Faire Sans Dire" (Do without saying)

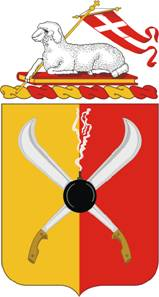
162nd Field Artillery
"Hasta El Cabo" (Up to the Hilt)

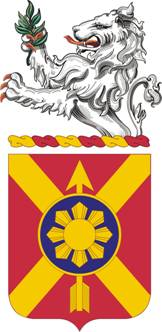
163rd Field Artillery
"Arms for Support"

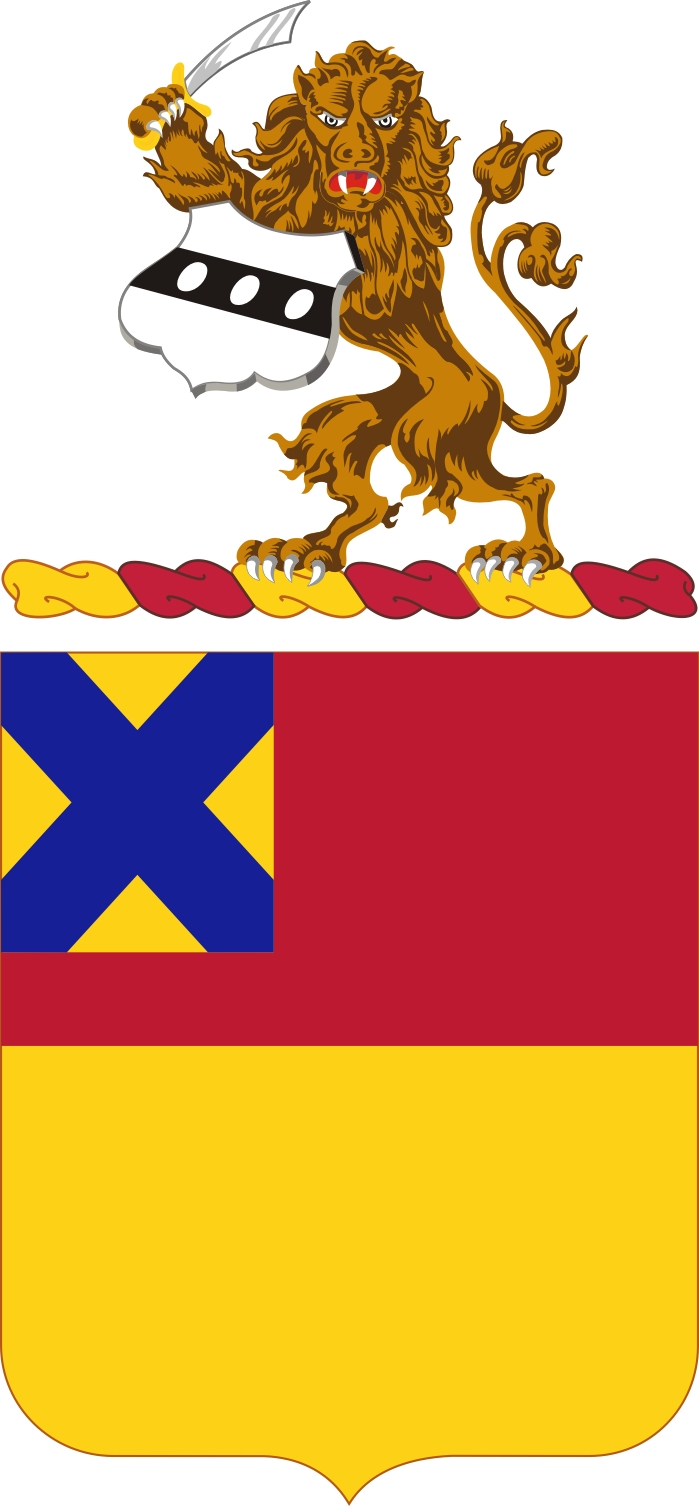
166th Field Artillery
"Fire for Effect

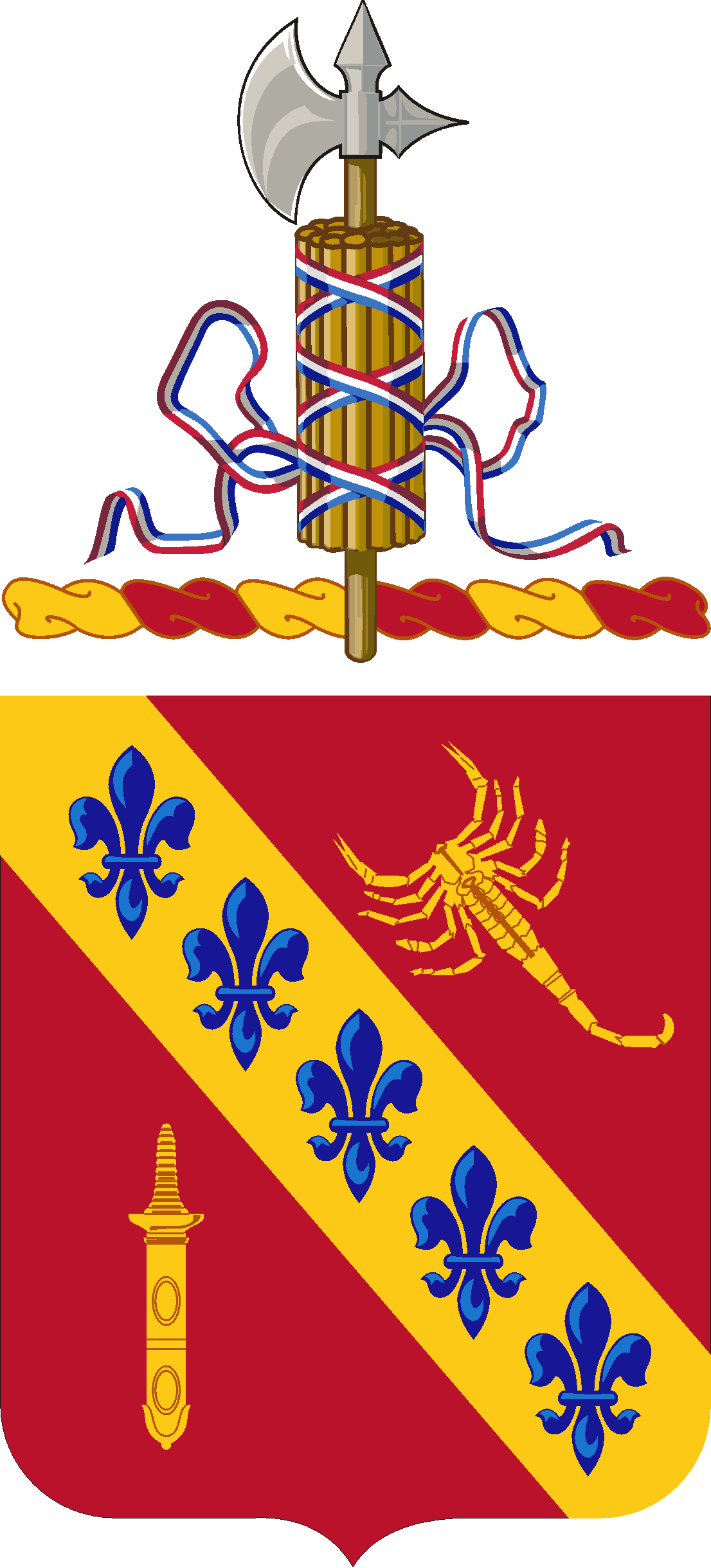
168th Field Artillery
"Accomplished with energy"

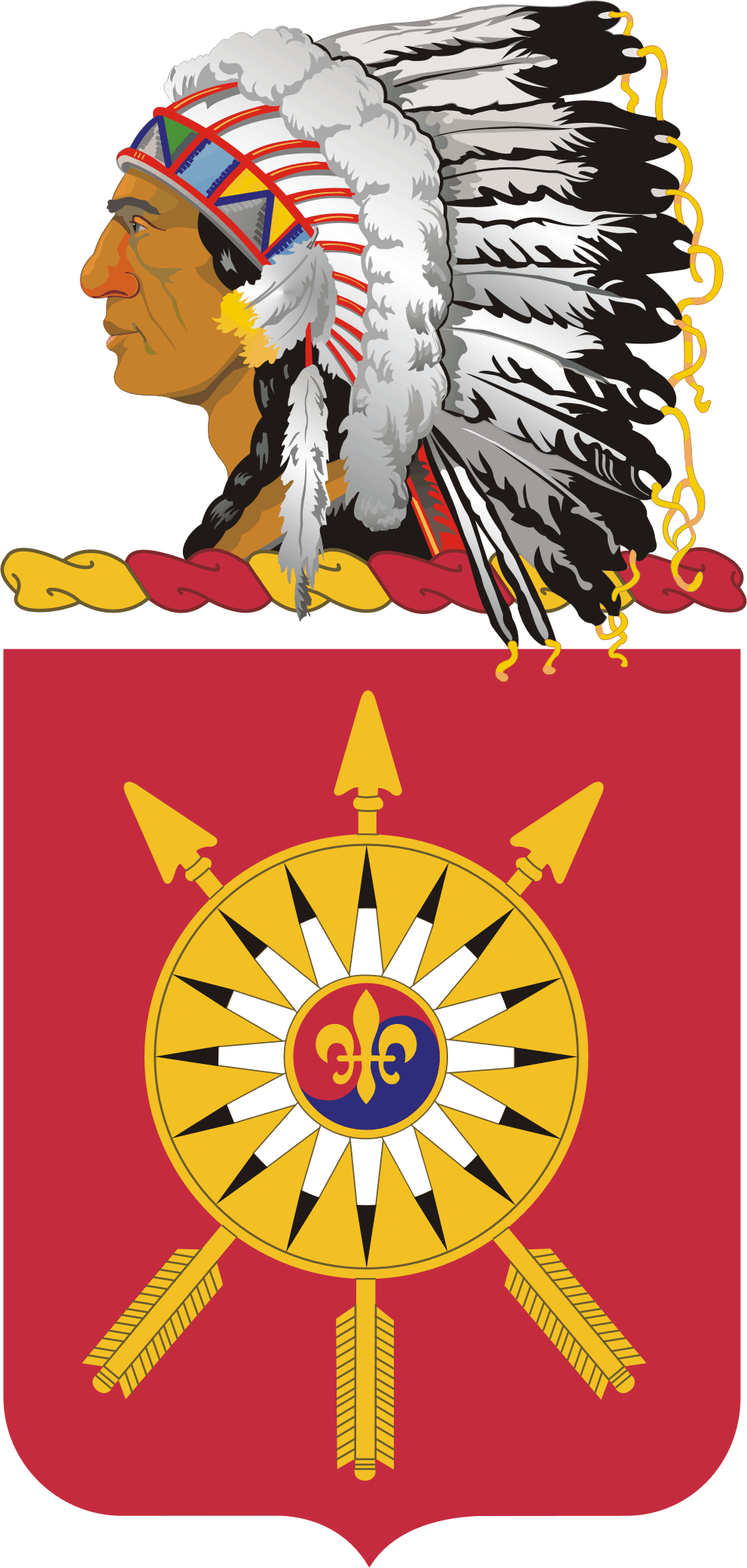
171st Field Artillery
"Eyes of the Artillery"

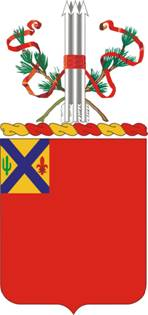
172nd Field Artillery
"Load with Canister"

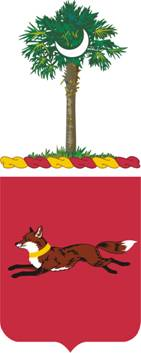
178th Field Artillery
"True and Tried"

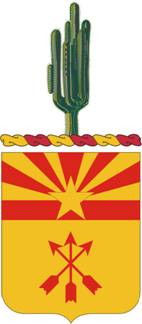
180th Field Artillery
"Vencer" (To Conquer)

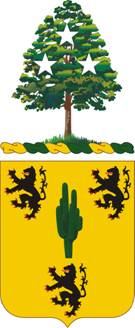
181st Field Artillery
"Hit 'em First"

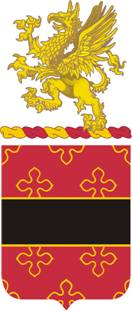
182nd Field Artillery
"Might if Right"

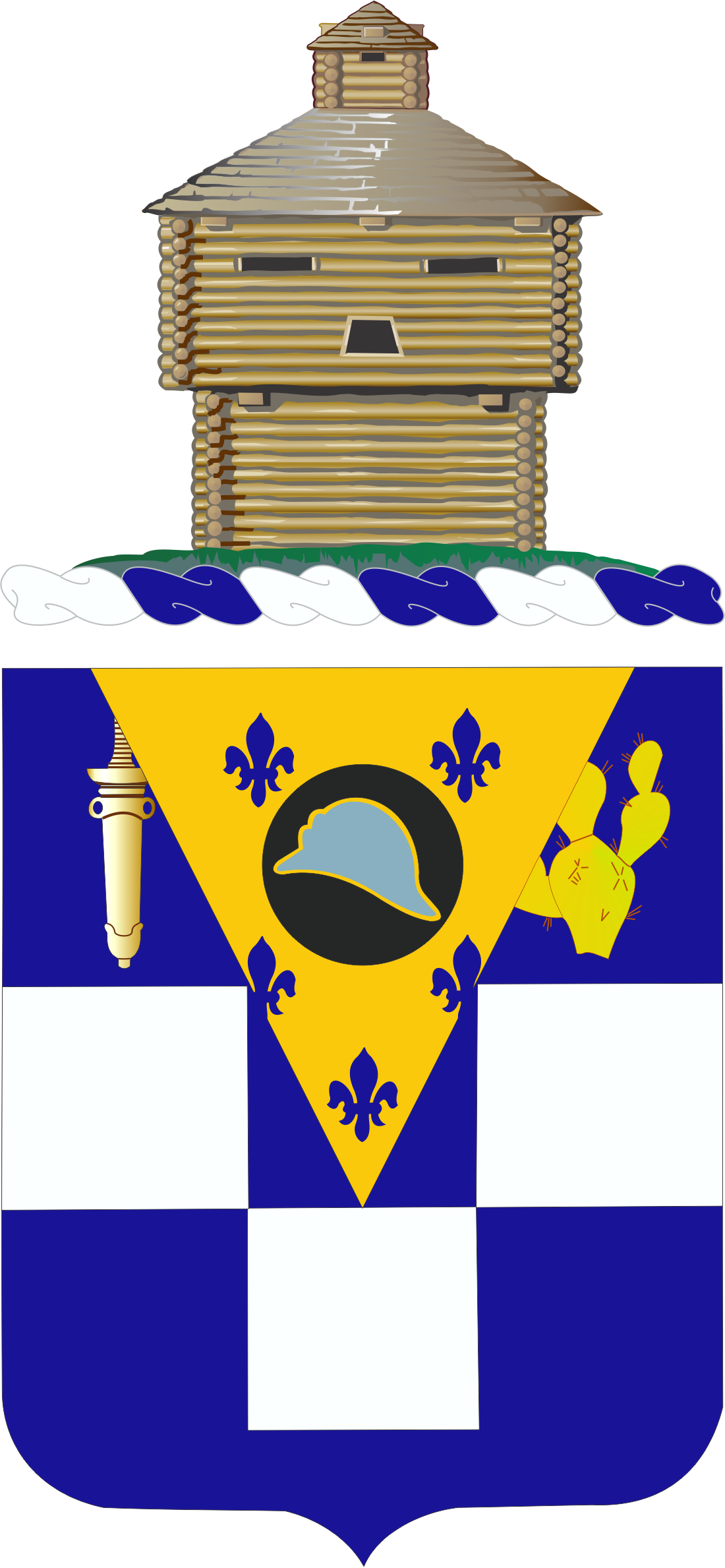
184th Field Artillery (former 178th Infantry)
"One country one flag"

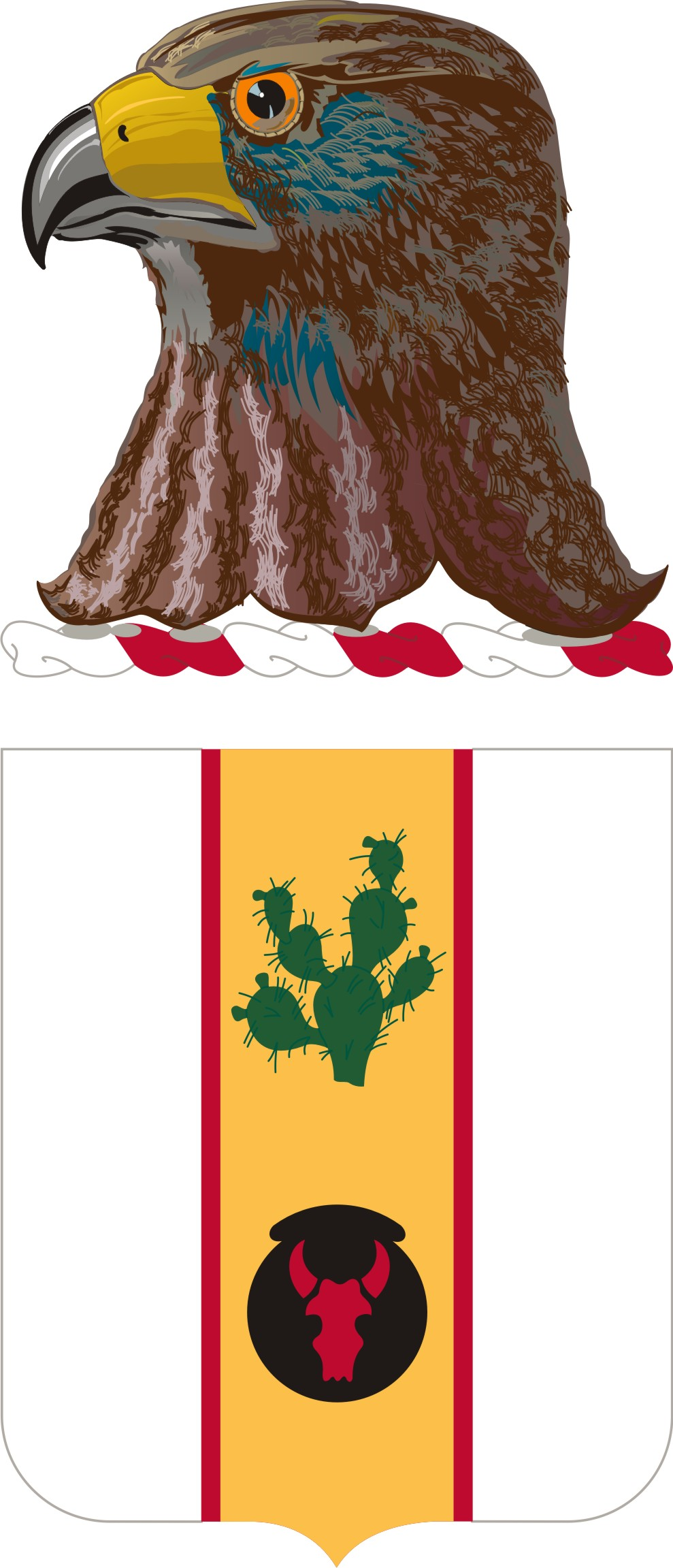
185th Field Artillery
"Redoubtable et fougueux" (Formidable And Fiery)

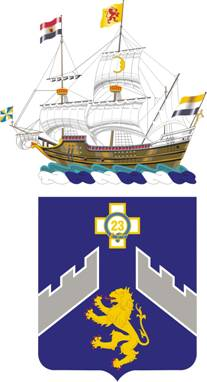
186th Field Artillery
(formerly 106th Infantry)
"Fidelis Et Constans" (Faithful and Constant)

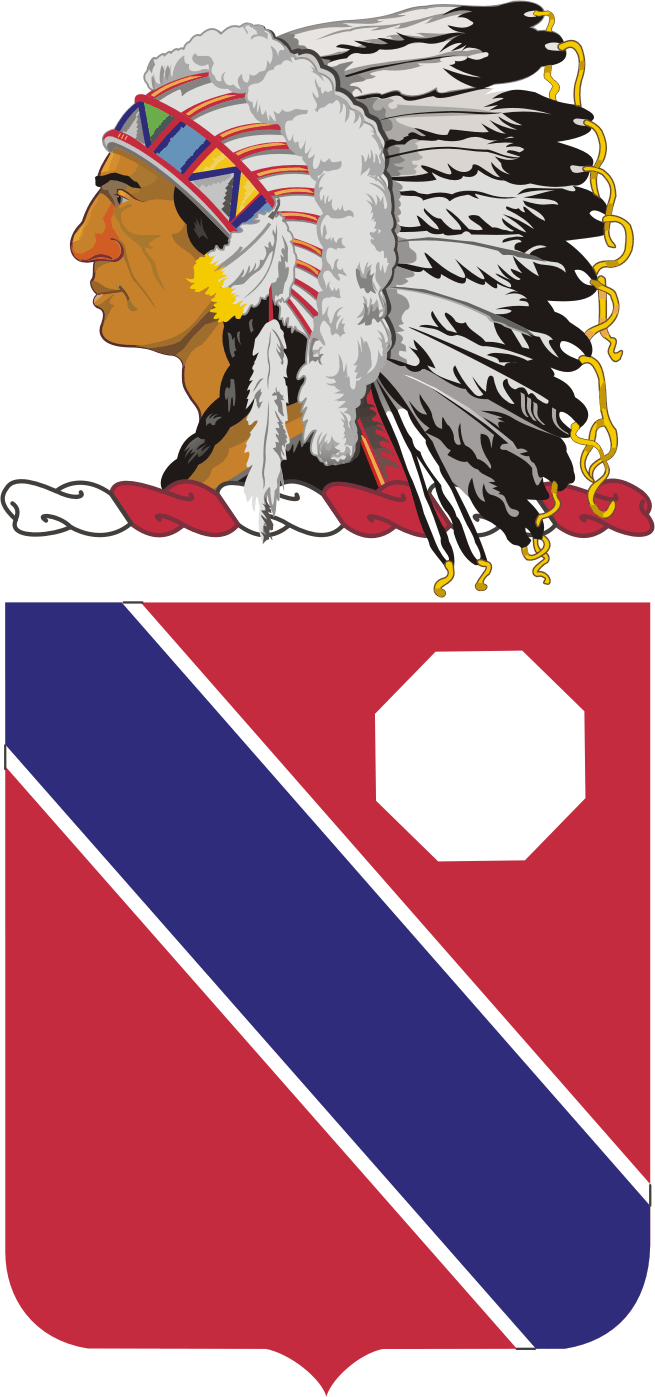
189th Field Artillery
"Honoris Custos" (The Guardian of Honor)

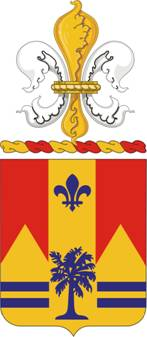
190th Field Artillery
"Mission With Honor"

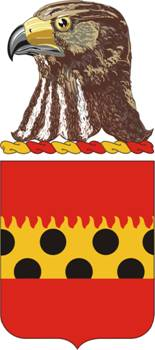
194th Field Artillery
"When Ready"

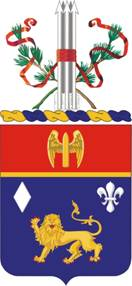
197th Field Artillery
(formerly 197th Coast Artillery)
"A Bas L’Avion" (Down With The Plane)

=== 201 to 300 ===
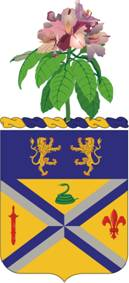
201st Field Artillery
(formerly 201st Infantry)
"Yes Sir"

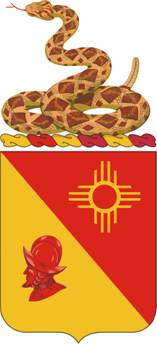
202nd Field Artillery
"Despejar Via" (To Clear The Way)

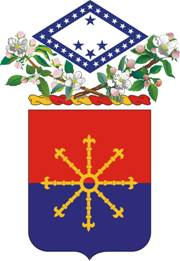
206th Field Artillery
(formerly 206th Coast Artillery)
"Never Give Up"

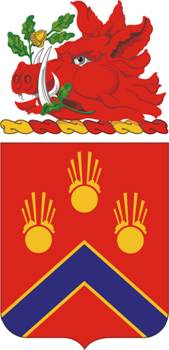
214th Field Artillery
(formerly 214th Coast Artillery)
"We Hear and Strike"

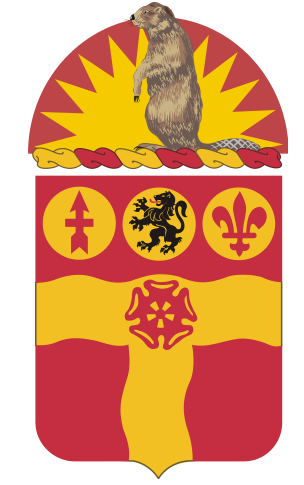
218th Field Artillery
(formerly 965th Field Artillery Battalion)
"Per Angustaad Augusta" (Through Difficulties To Things of Honor)

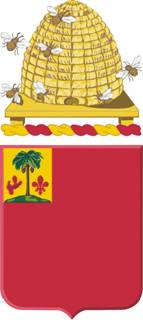
222nd Field Artillery
"Serve the Guns Unshrinkingly"

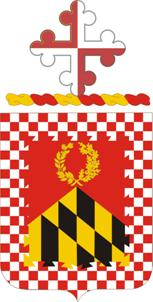
224th Field Artillery
"Quercus Crescit" (The Oak Grows)

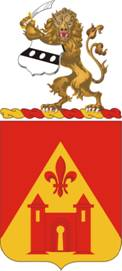
229th Field Artillery
"Spirit, Speed, and Stamina"

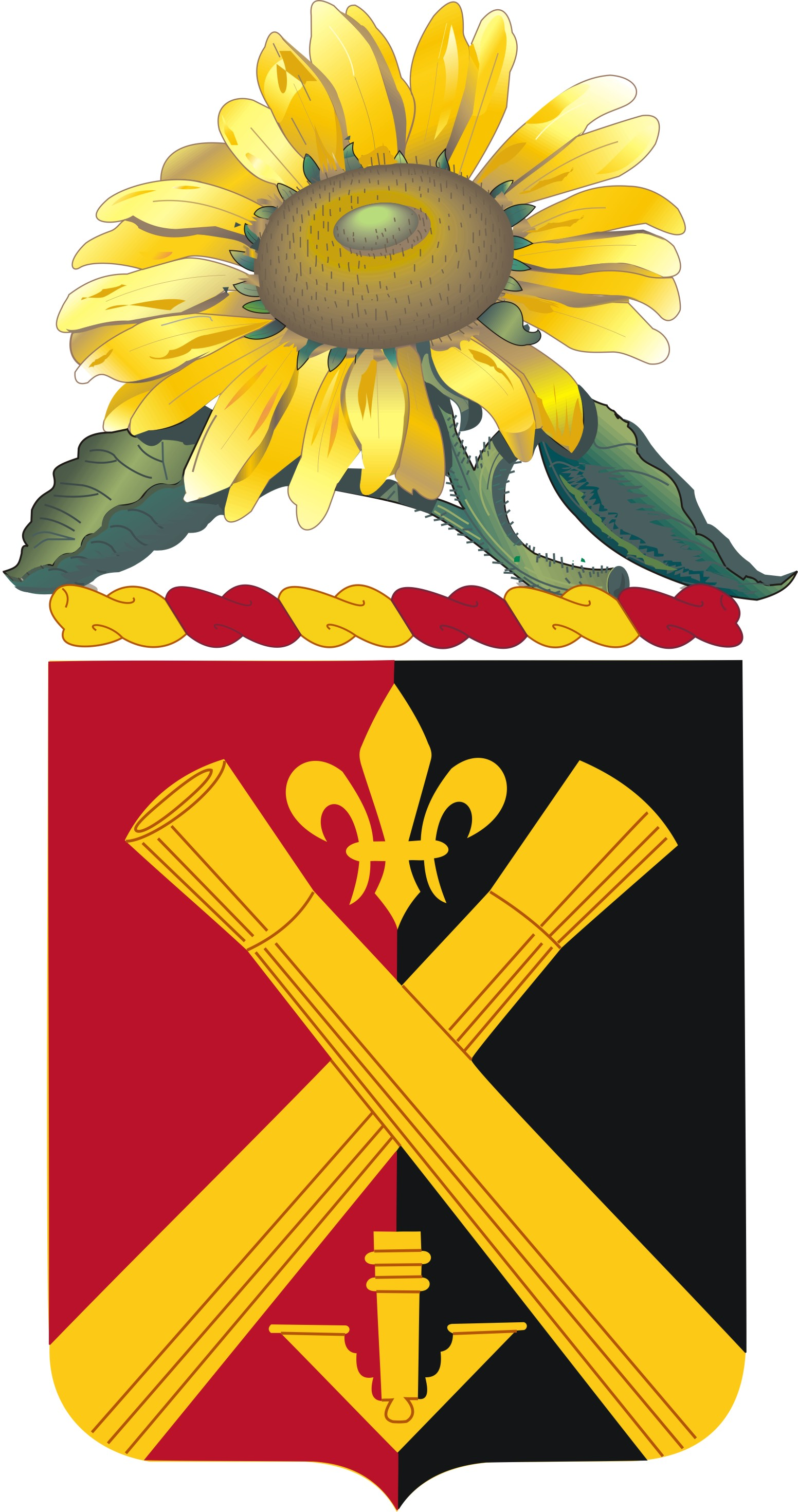
235th Field Artillery
"Meet our Thunder"

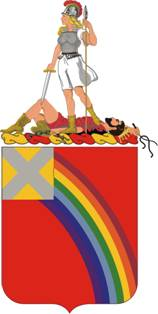
246th Field Artillery
(formerly 246th Coast Artillery)
"Prepared to Defend"

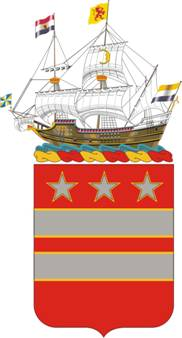
258th Field Artillery
"Paratus Et Fidelis" (Ready and Faithful)

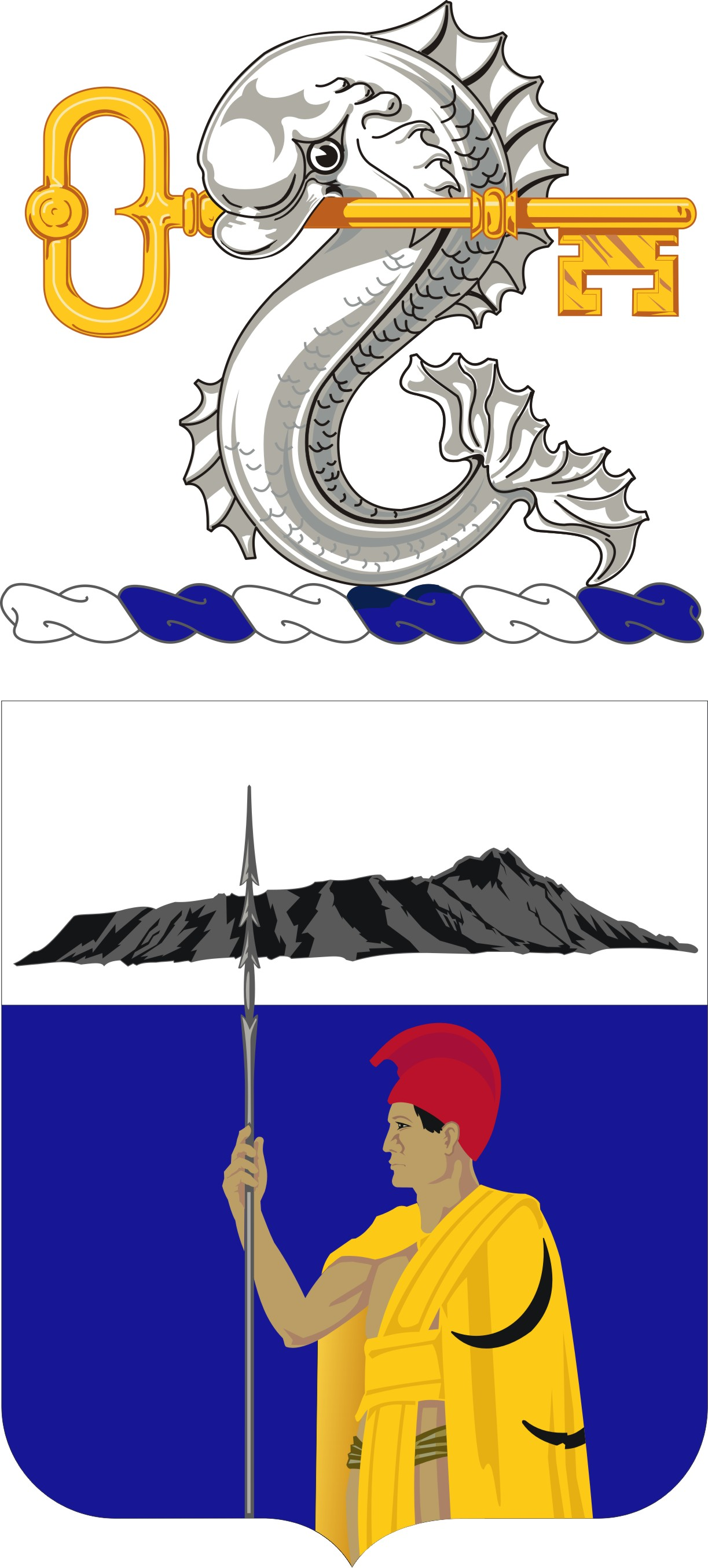
298th Field Artillery
"Makaukau Kakou" (We Are Prepared)

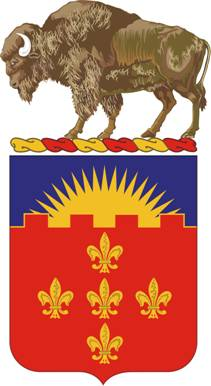
300th Field Artillery
(formerly 49th Field Artillery & 115th Cavalry)
"Powder River"

=== 301 on ===
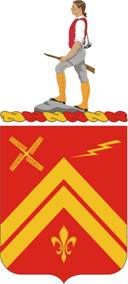
309th Field Artillery
"Our Utmost Always"

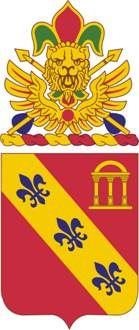
319th Field Artillery
"Loyalty"

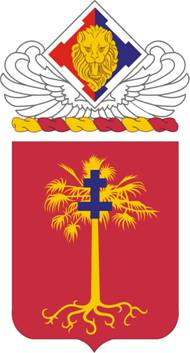
320th Field Artillery
"Volens Et Potens" (Willing and Able)

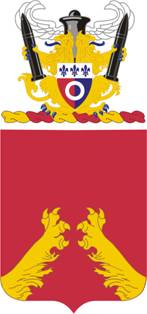
321st Field Artillery
"Noli Me Tangere" (Don’t Tread On Me)

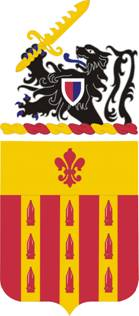
333rd Field Artillery
"Three Rounds"

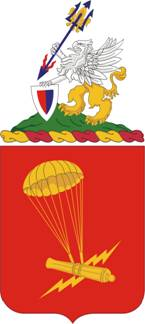
377th Field Artillery
"Firmiter et Fideliter" (Steadfastly and Faithfully)

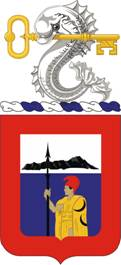
487th Field Artillery (former 227th Engineer Battalion)
"Hiki No" (Certainly, It Can Be Done)

623rd Field Artillery
"Seize The Opportunity"

== Aviation units ==
=== 1 to 100 ===
1st Aviation
"Super Primum" (Above the first)

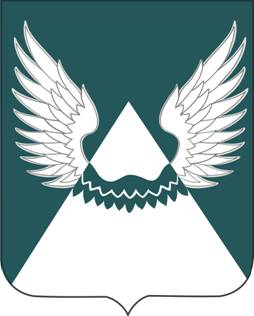
2nd Aviation
"Excelsus" (Lofty)

3rd Aviation
'Ex alis pugnamis" (We Fight On Wings)

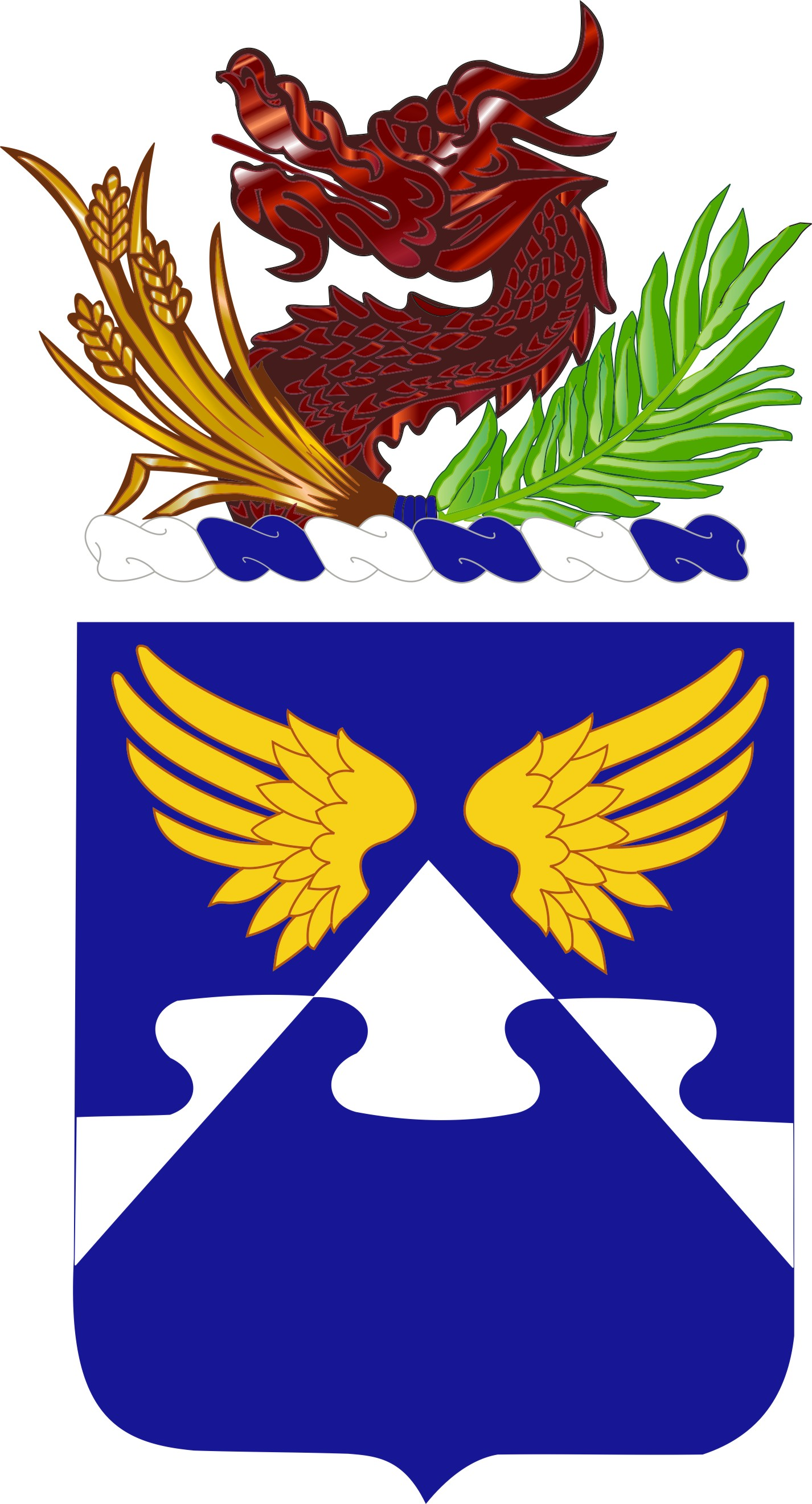
4th Aviation
"Vigilantia aeterna" (eternal vigilance)

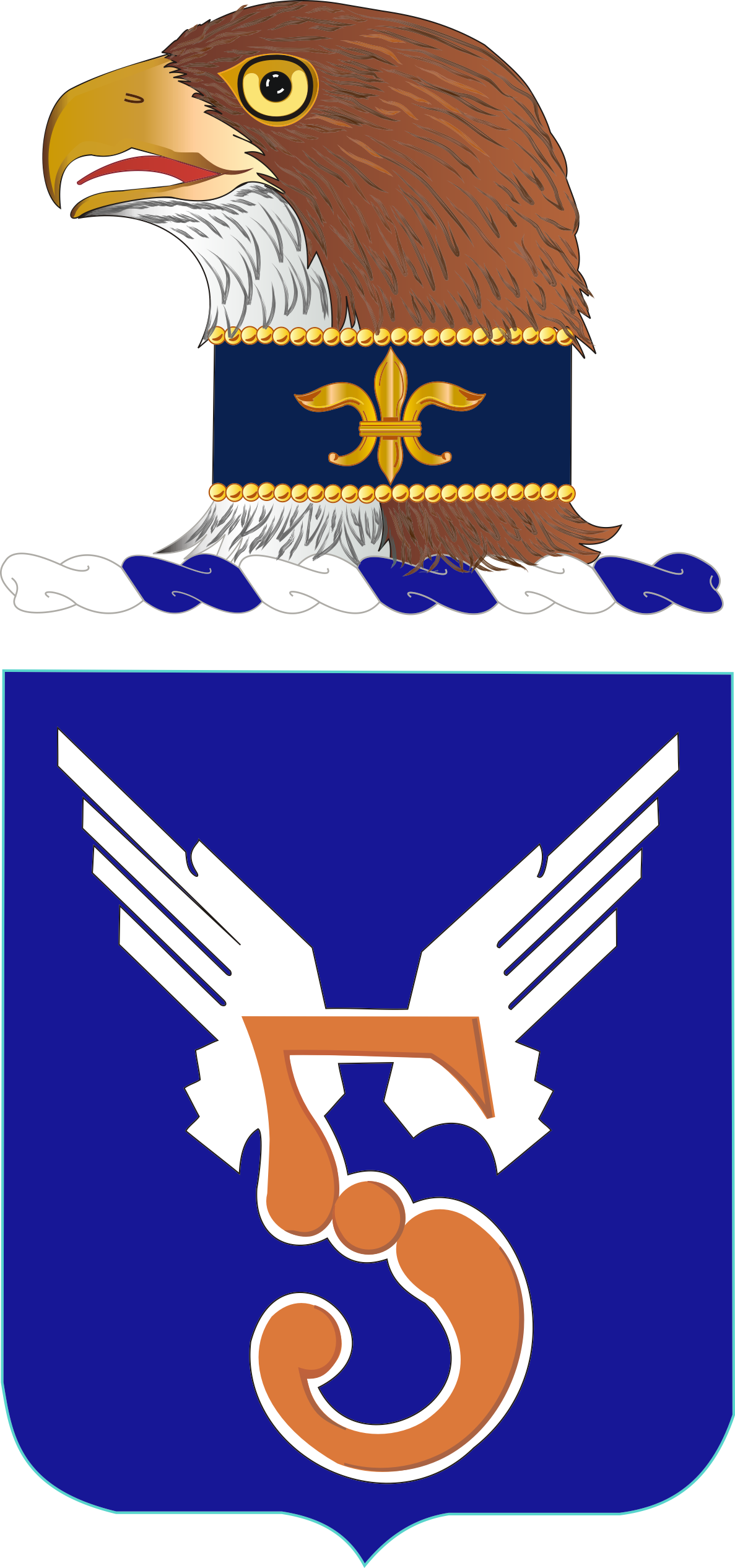
5th Aviation
"Acute and alert"

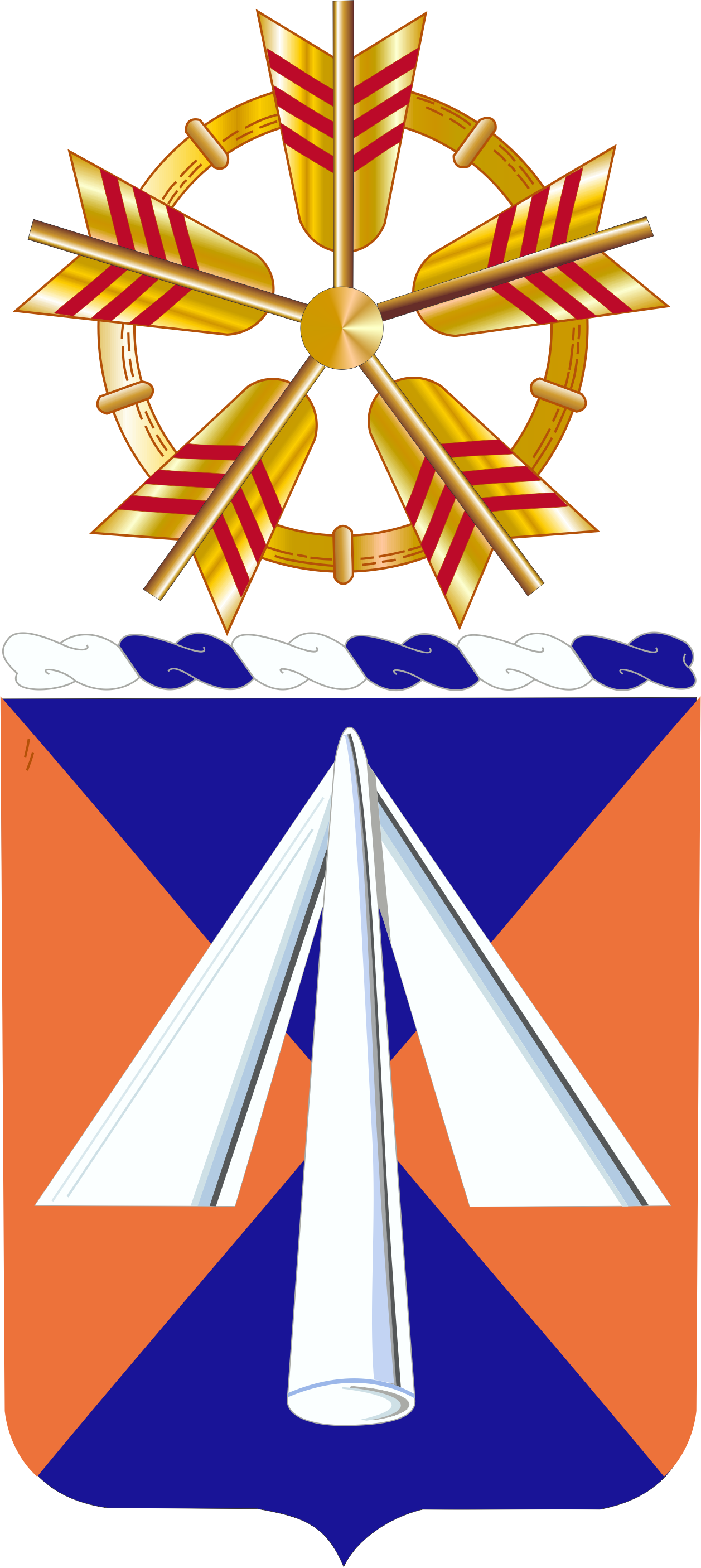
9th Aviation
"Anytime anywhere"

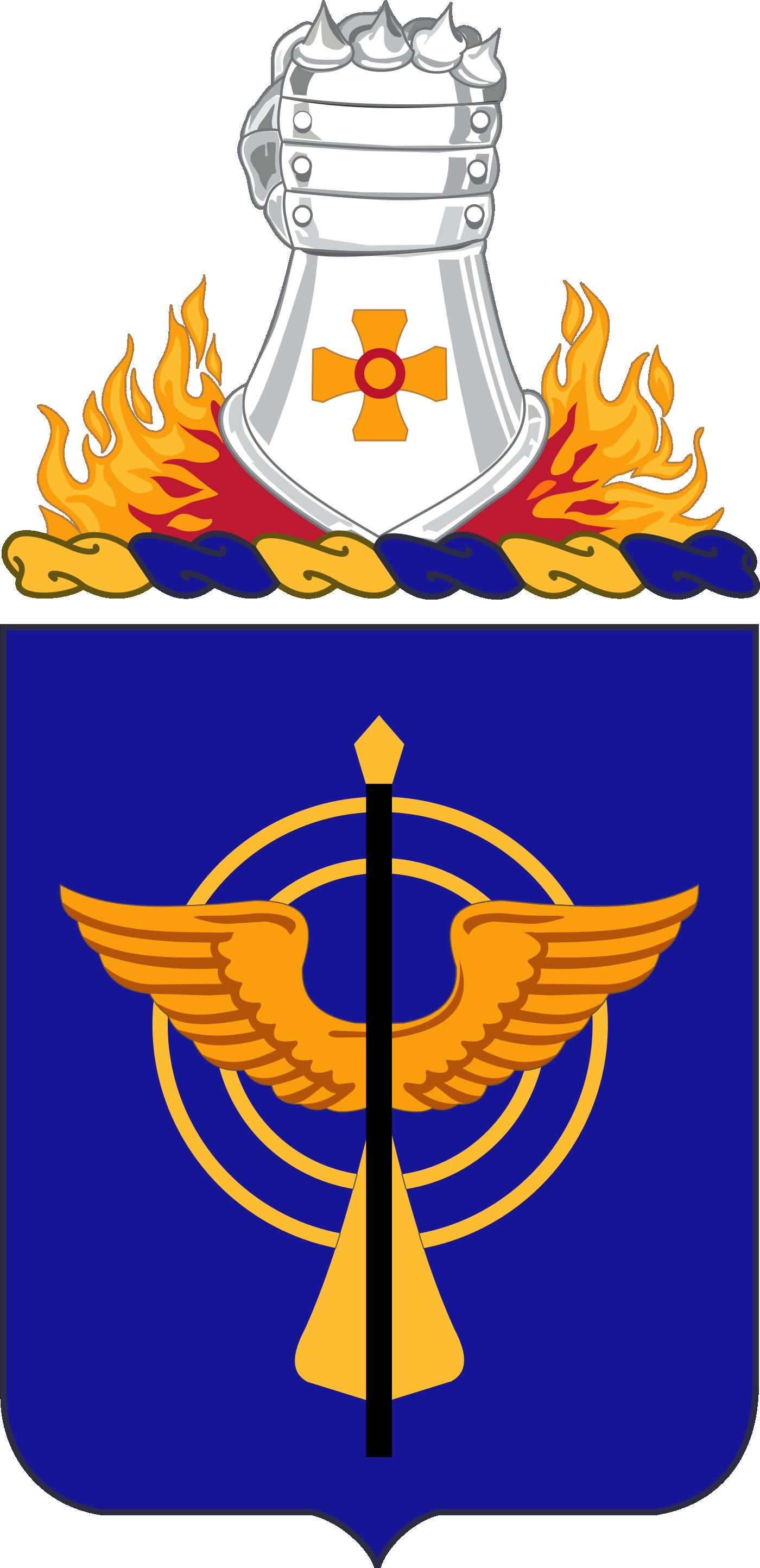
10th Aviation
"Soldiers of the Sky"

11th Aviation
"Exempla Proponere" (To Set Forth Examples)

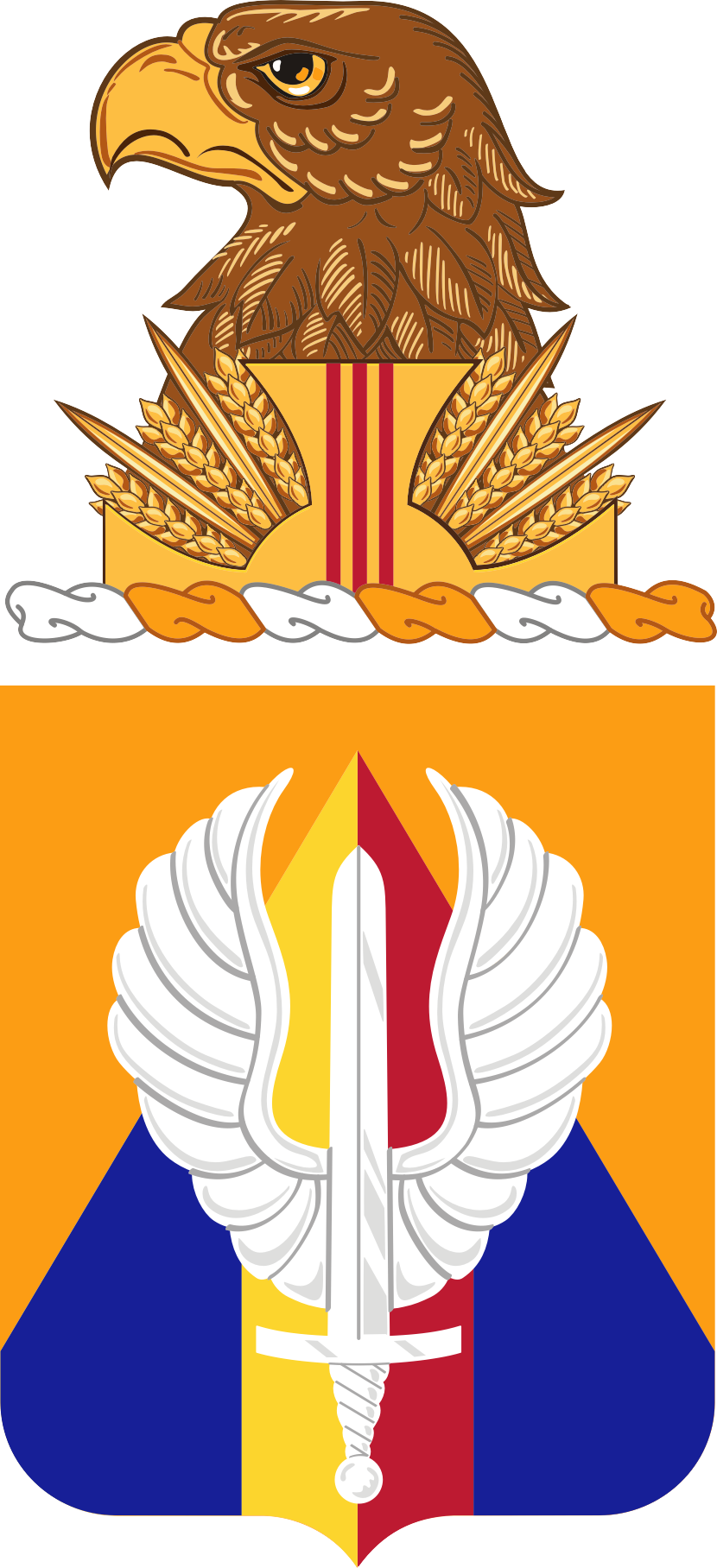
13th Aviation
"Swift and deadly"

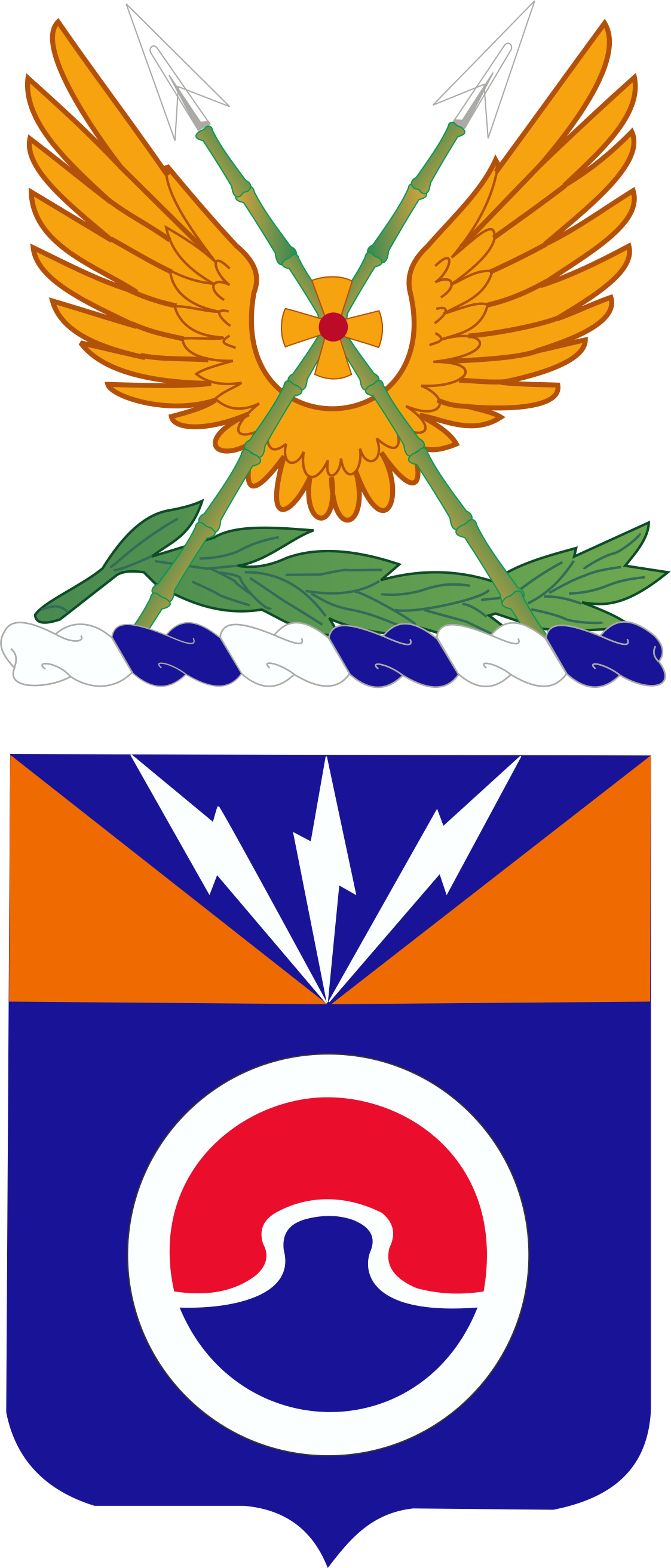
14th Aviation
"Versatility"

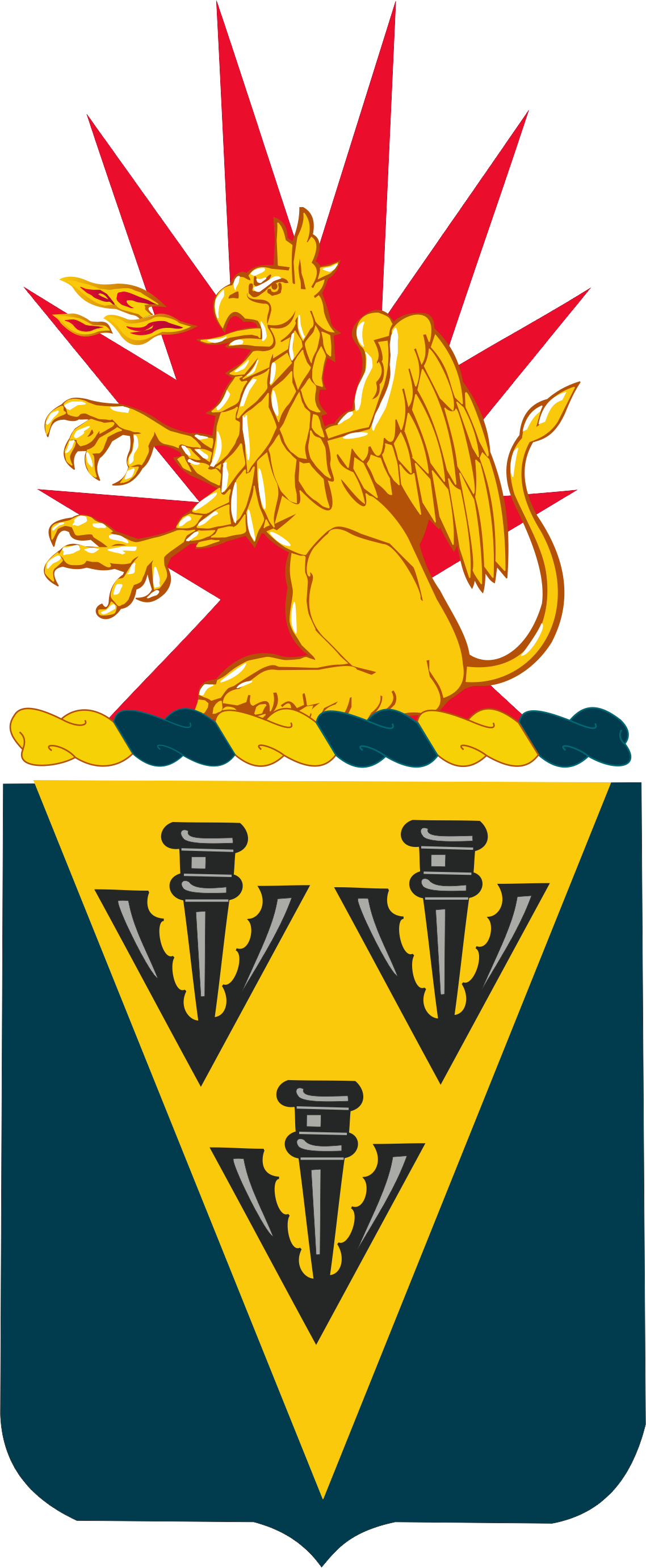
24th Aviation
"Ever Watchful"

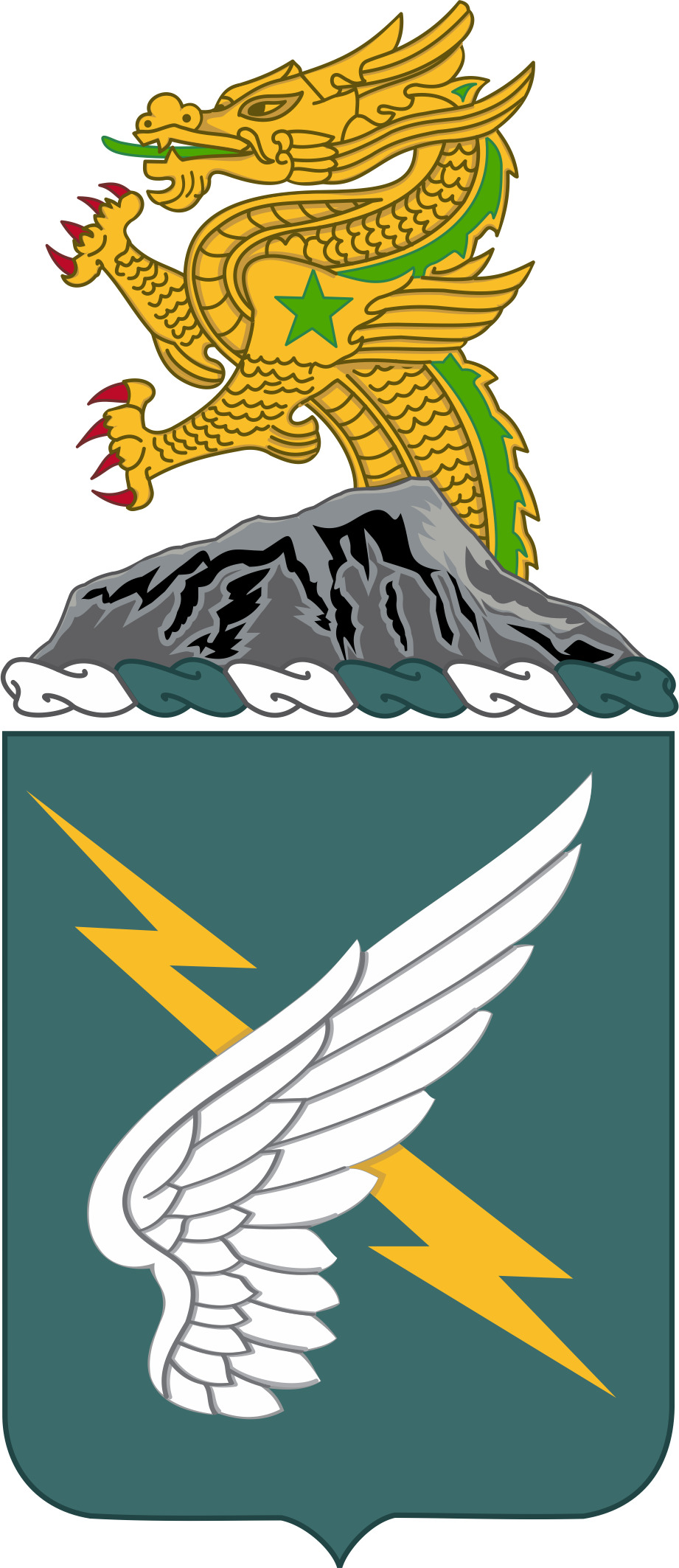
25th Aviation
"Lele Makou no na Puali" (We Fly For The Troops)

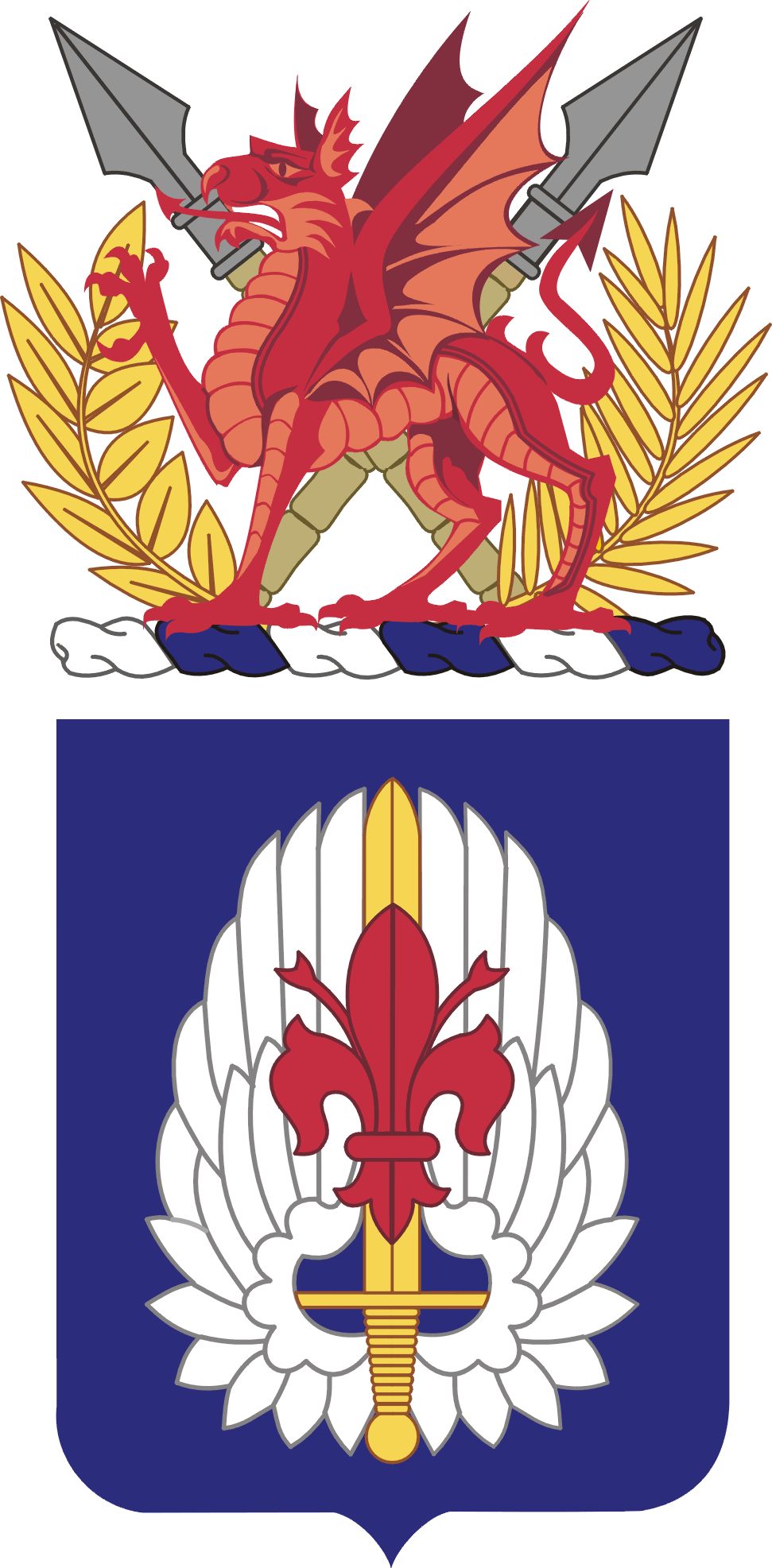
52nd Aviation
"Flying Dragons"

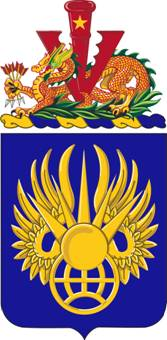
58th Aviation
"Safe Orderly Expeditious"

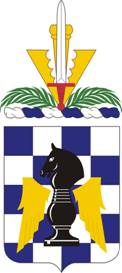
82nd Aviation
"Ground Air Mobility"

=== 101 to 200 ===
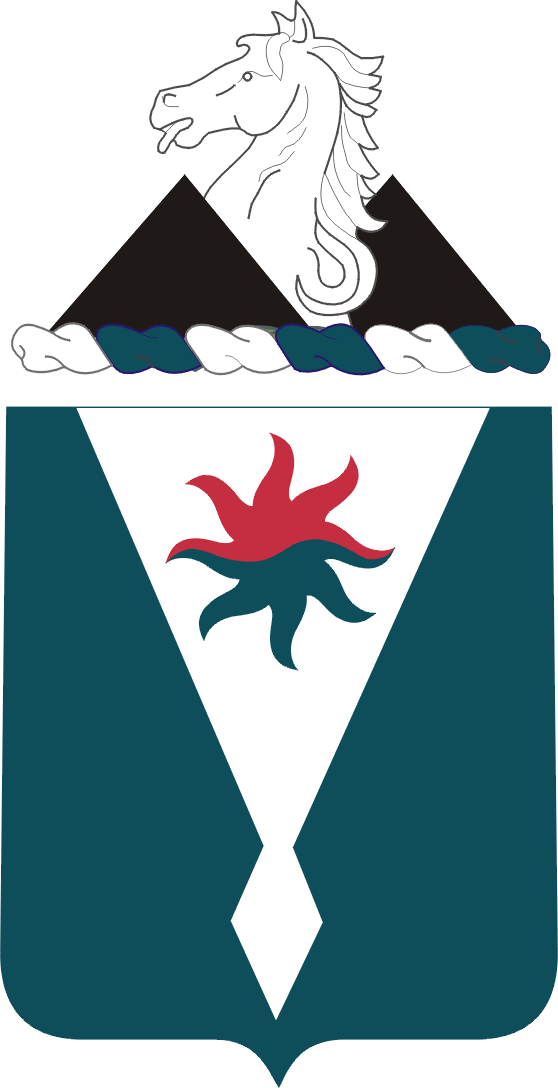
101st Aviation
"Wings of the Eagle"

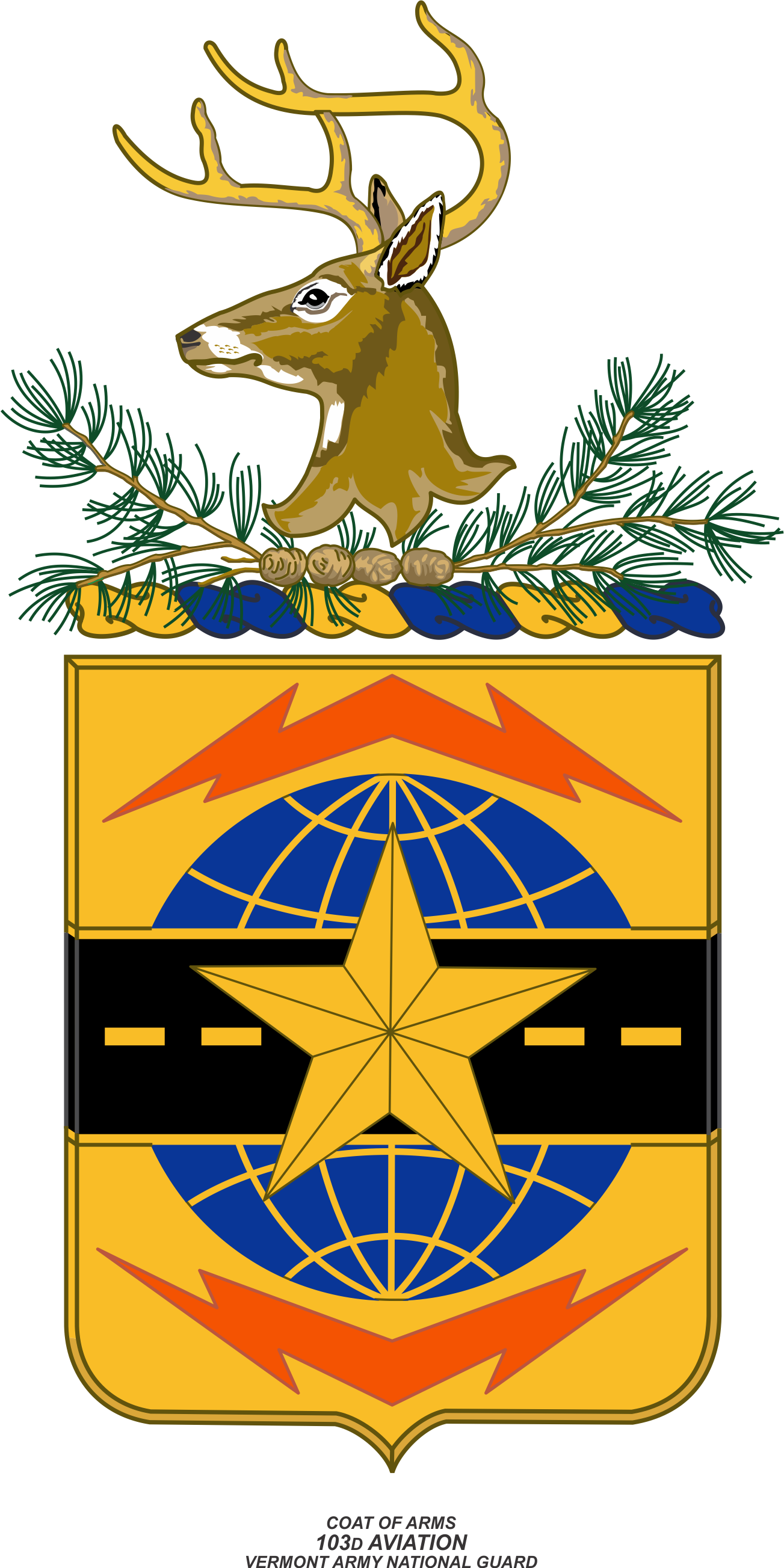
103rd Aviation
"Highway of the Sky"

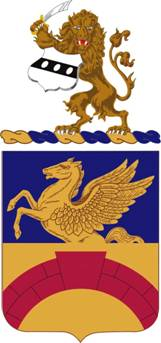
104th Aviation
"Winged Support"

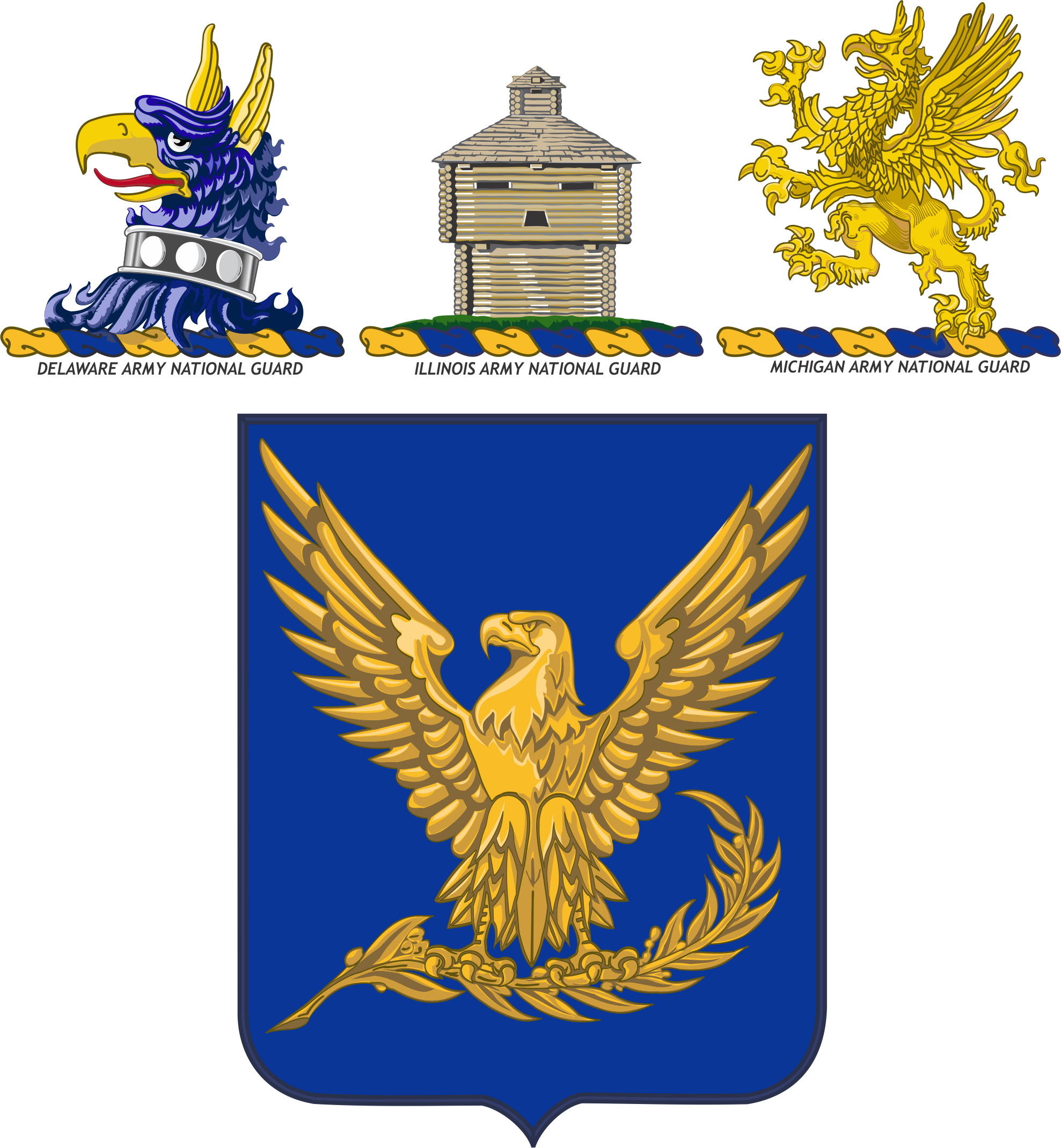
106th Aviation
"Commitment to Excellence"

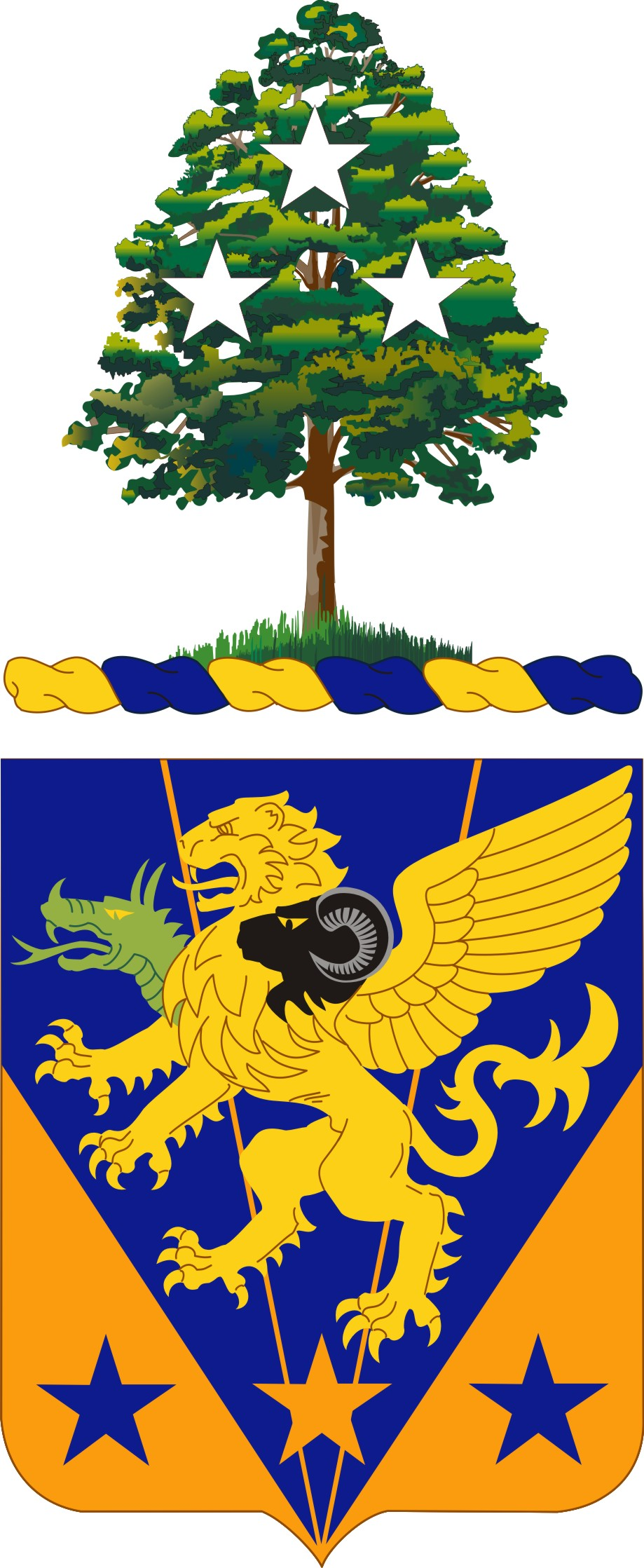
107th Aviation
"Volunteers Voice"

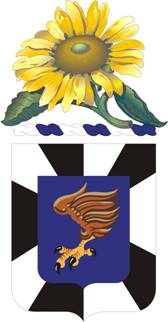
108th Aviation
"We Defend From Above"

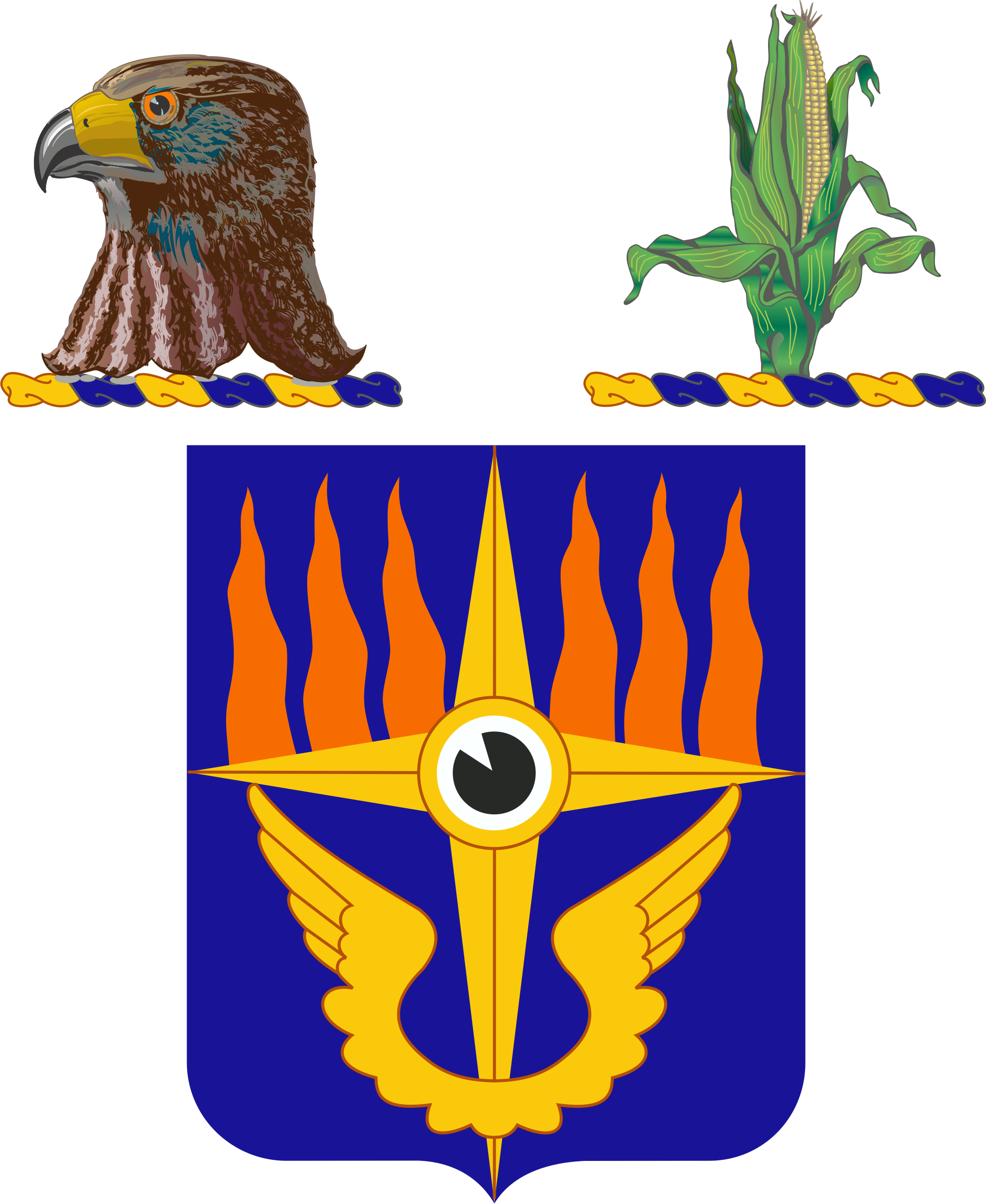
109th Aviation
"Safely on Time"

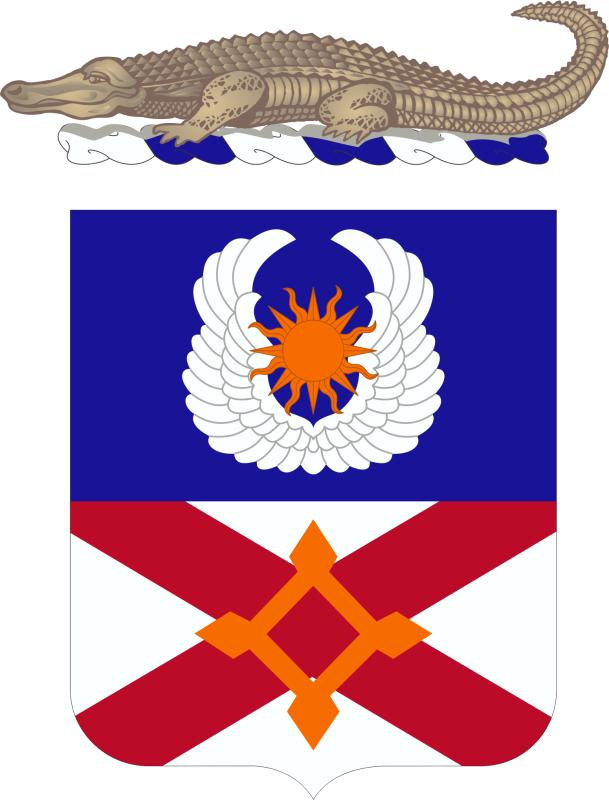
111th Aviation
"Air Warrior Air Attack"

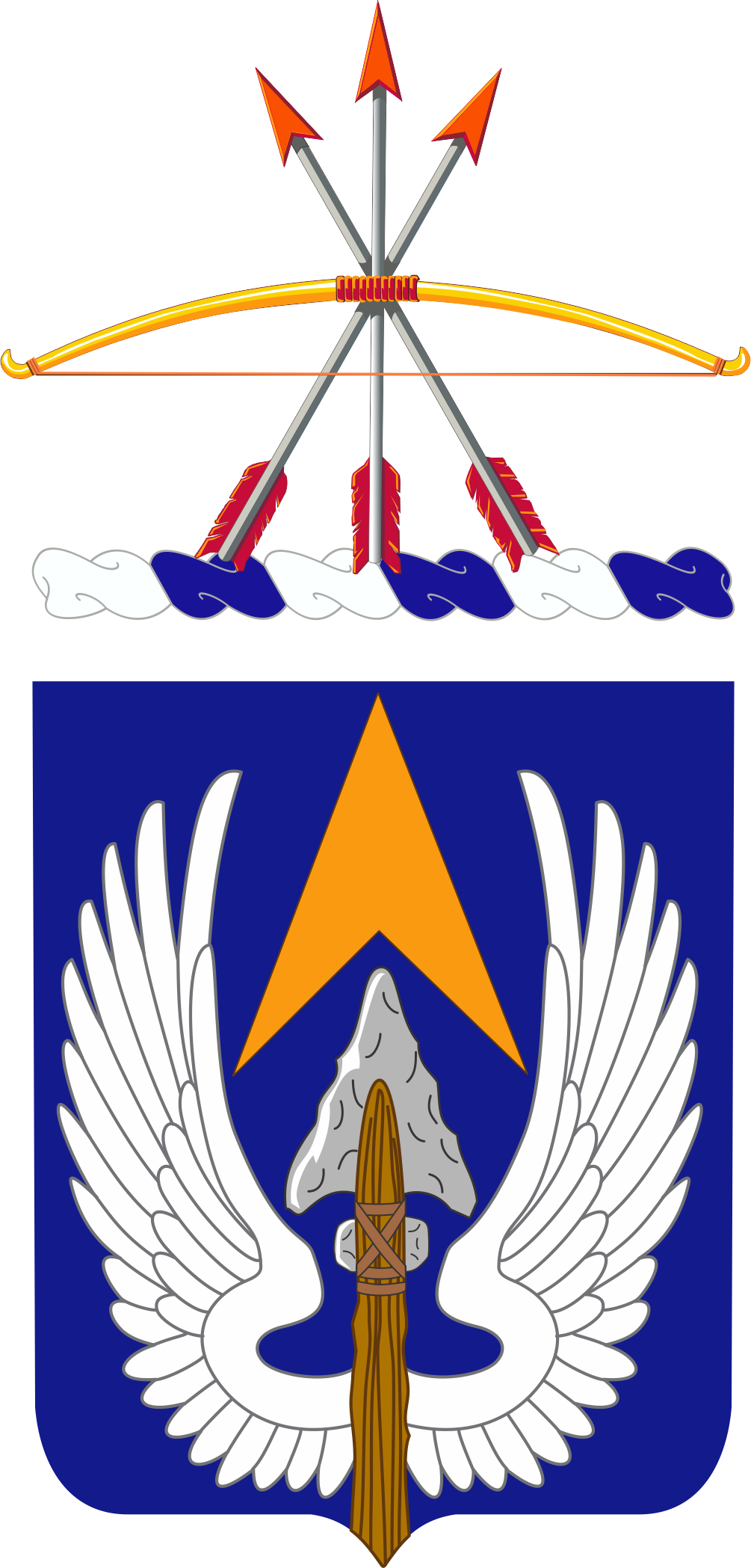
112th Aviation
"Arrows in Flight"

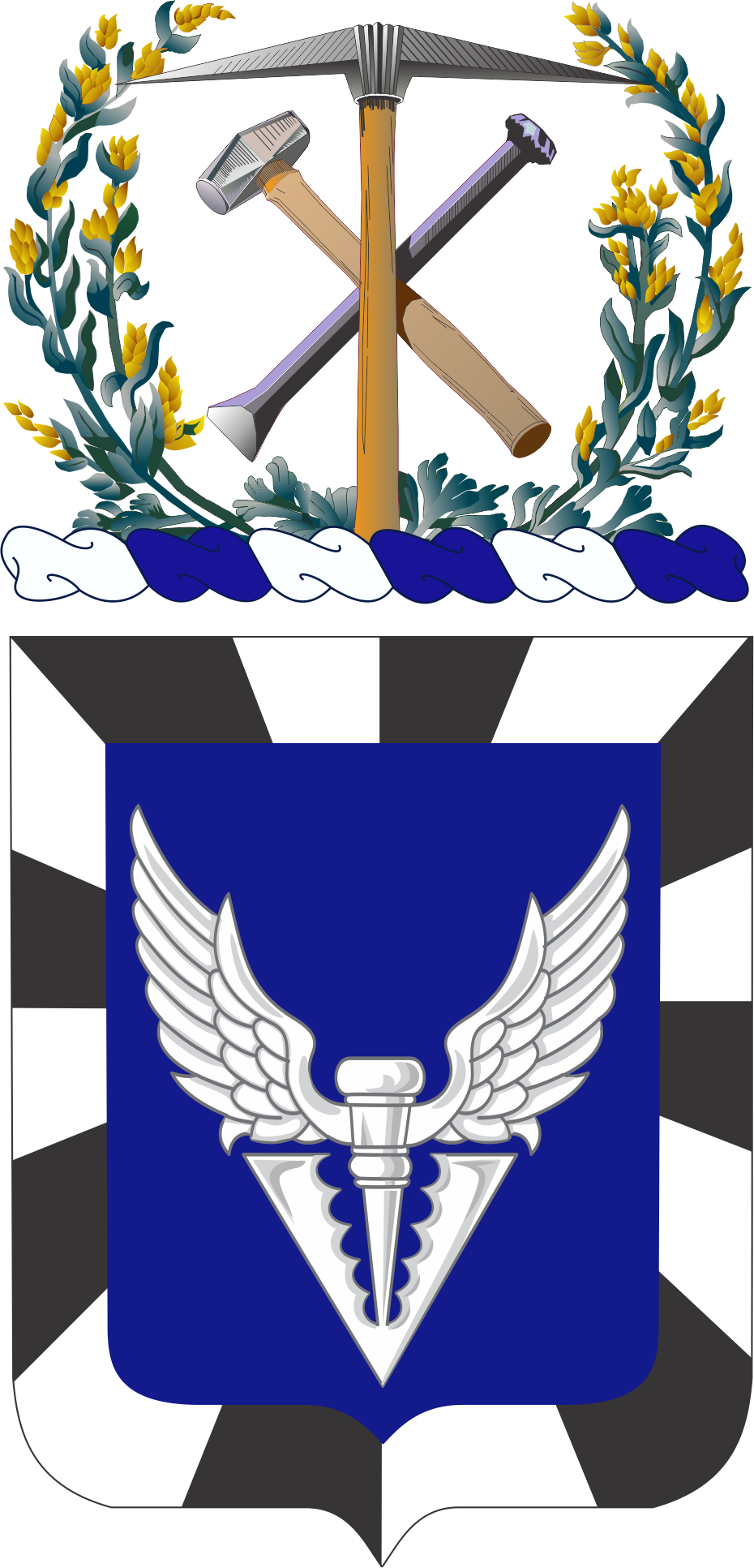
113th Aviation
"Fidelity Fraternity Veracity"

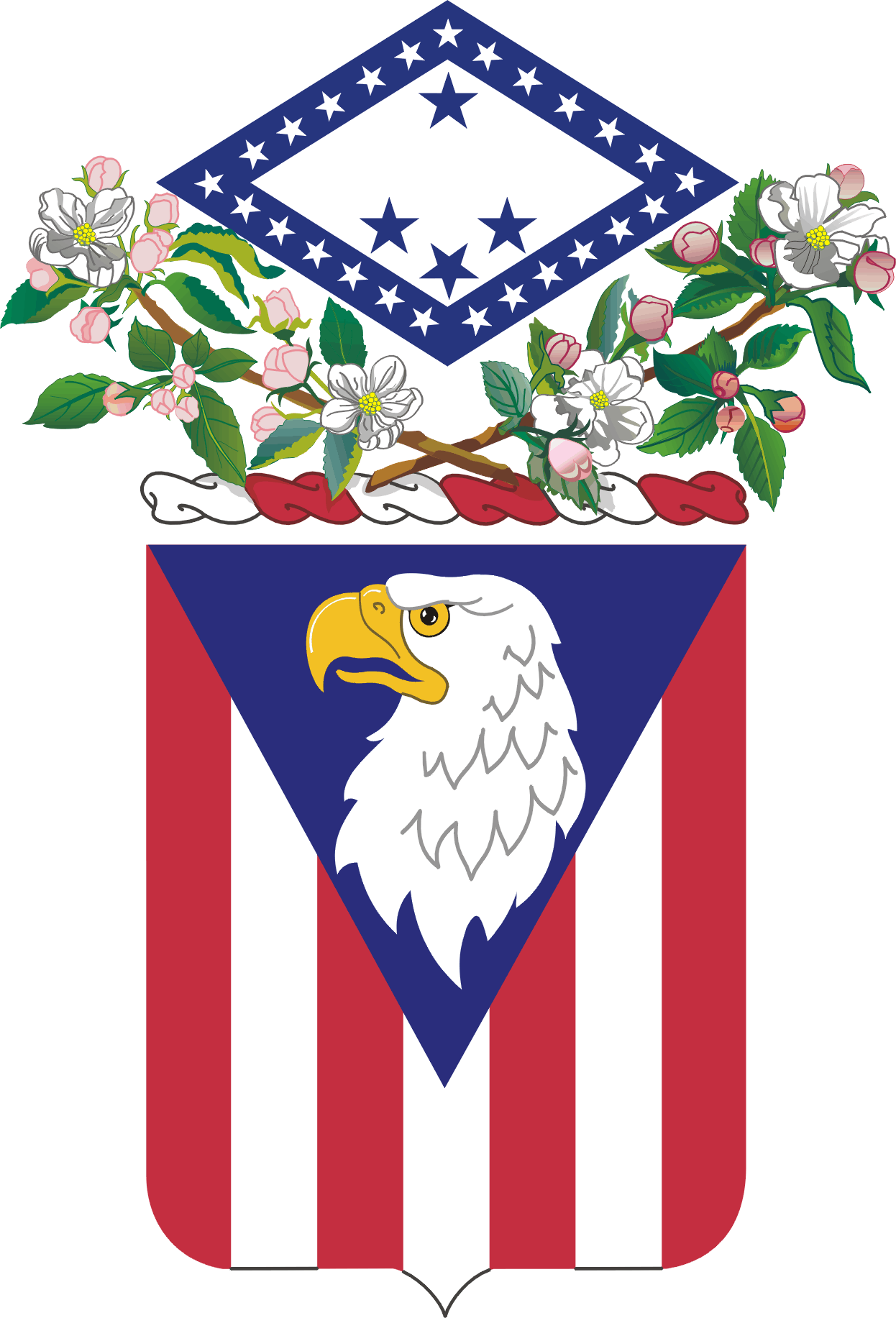
114th Aviation
"Eagles of Liberty"

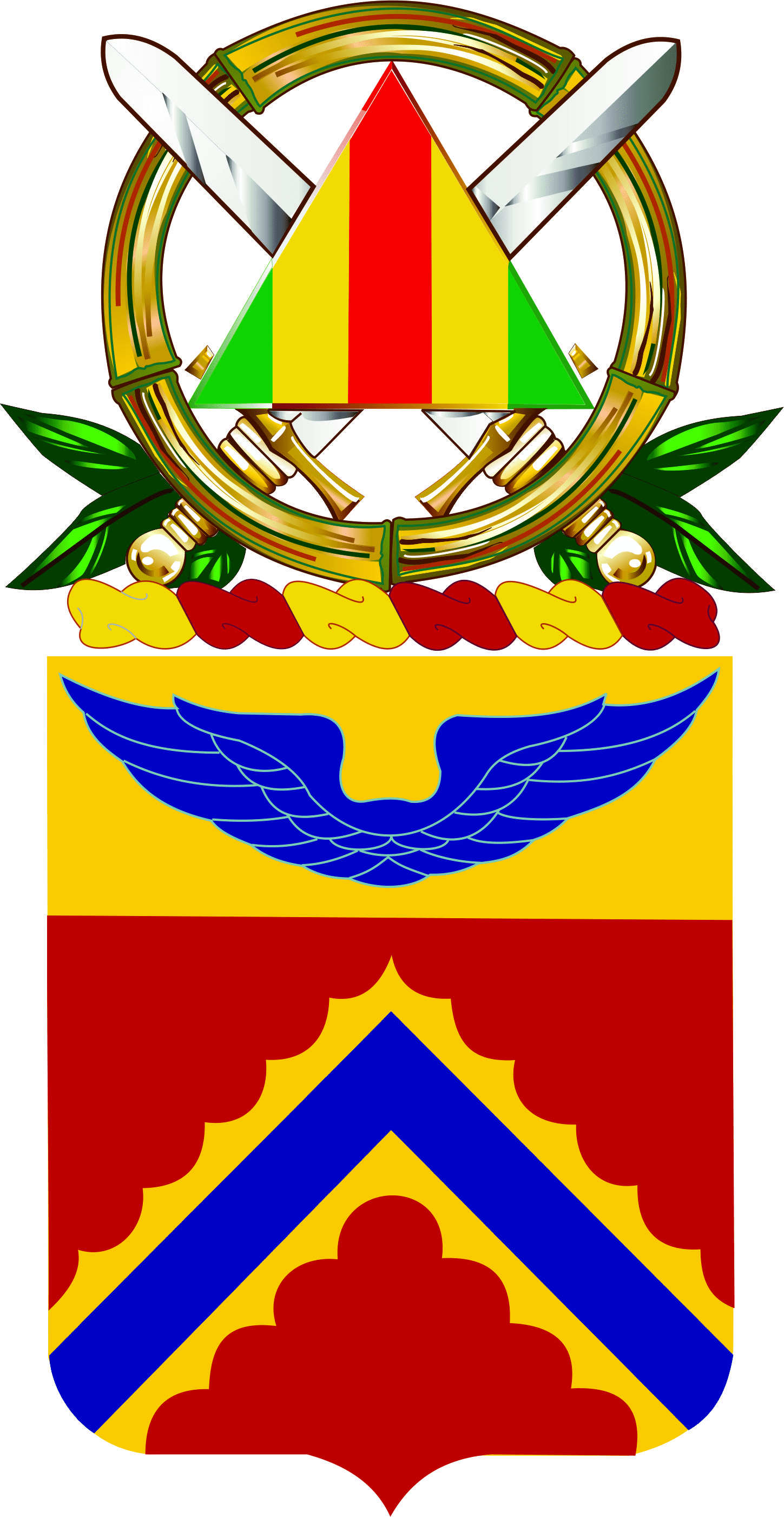
123rd Aviation
"Courage and Strength"

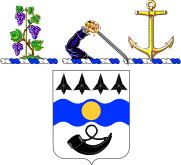
126th Aviation
"Faith Flight Fidelity"

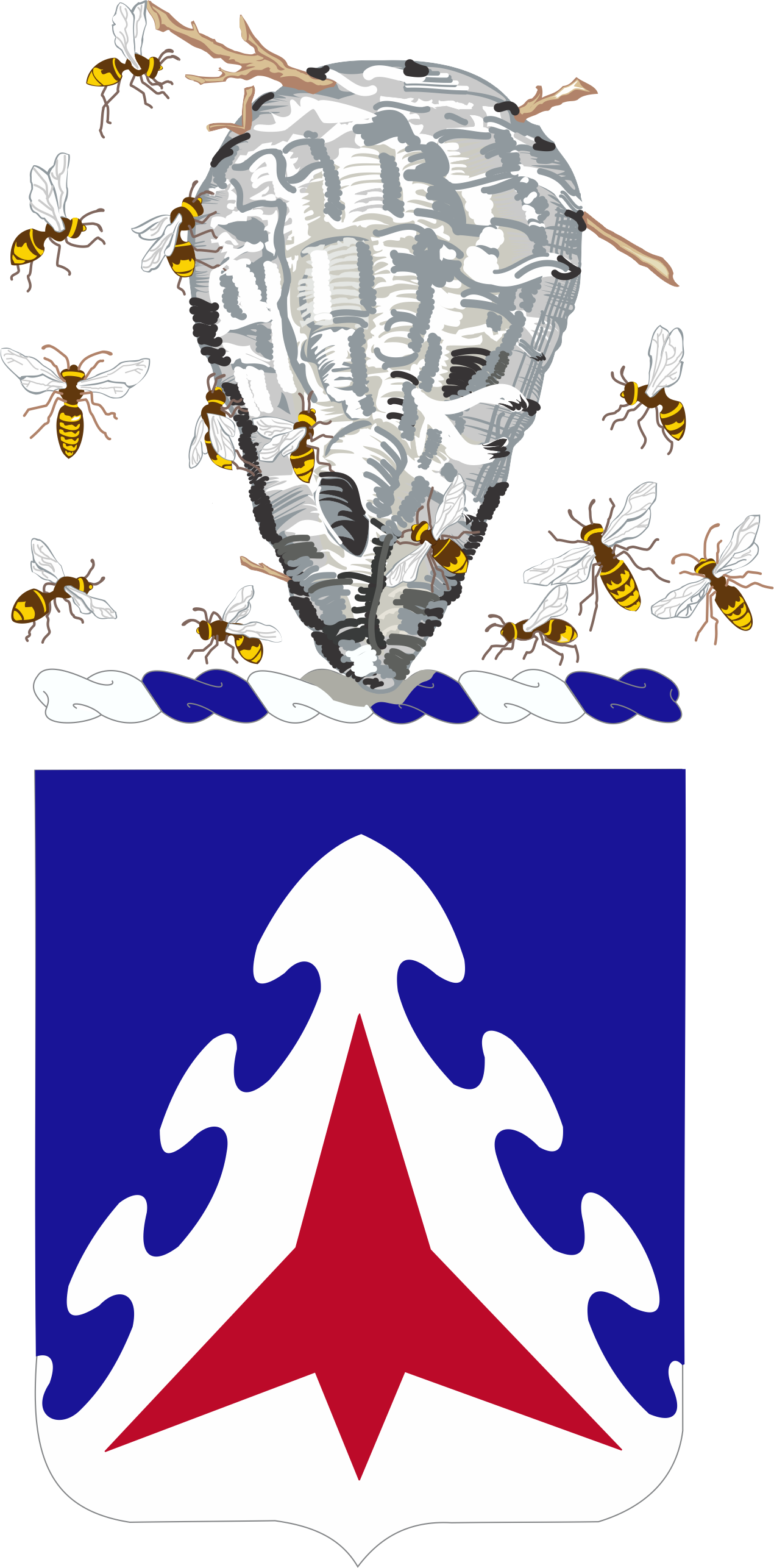
130th Aviation
"The Eyes of Command"

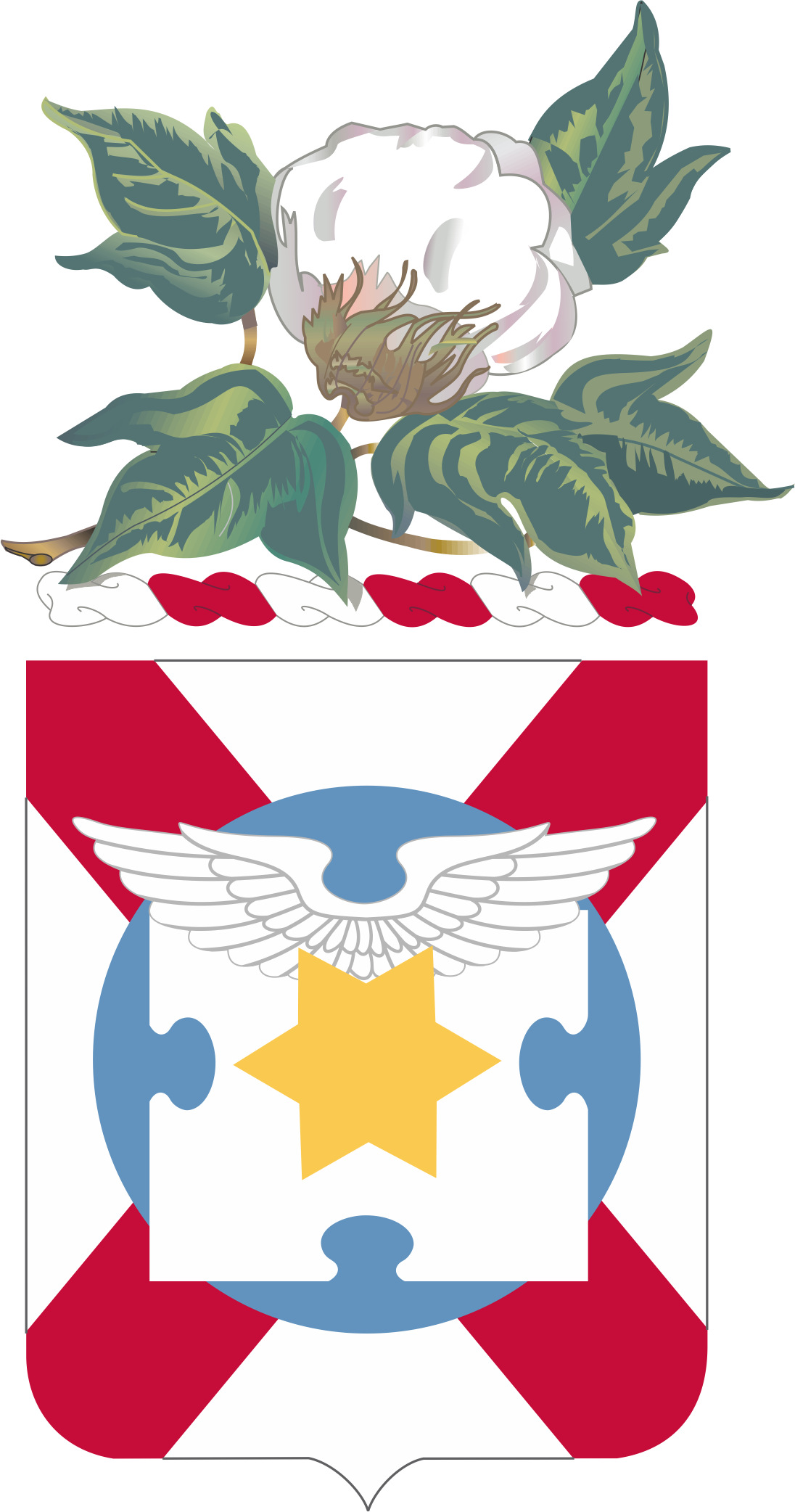
131st Aviation
"Where Eagles Dare"

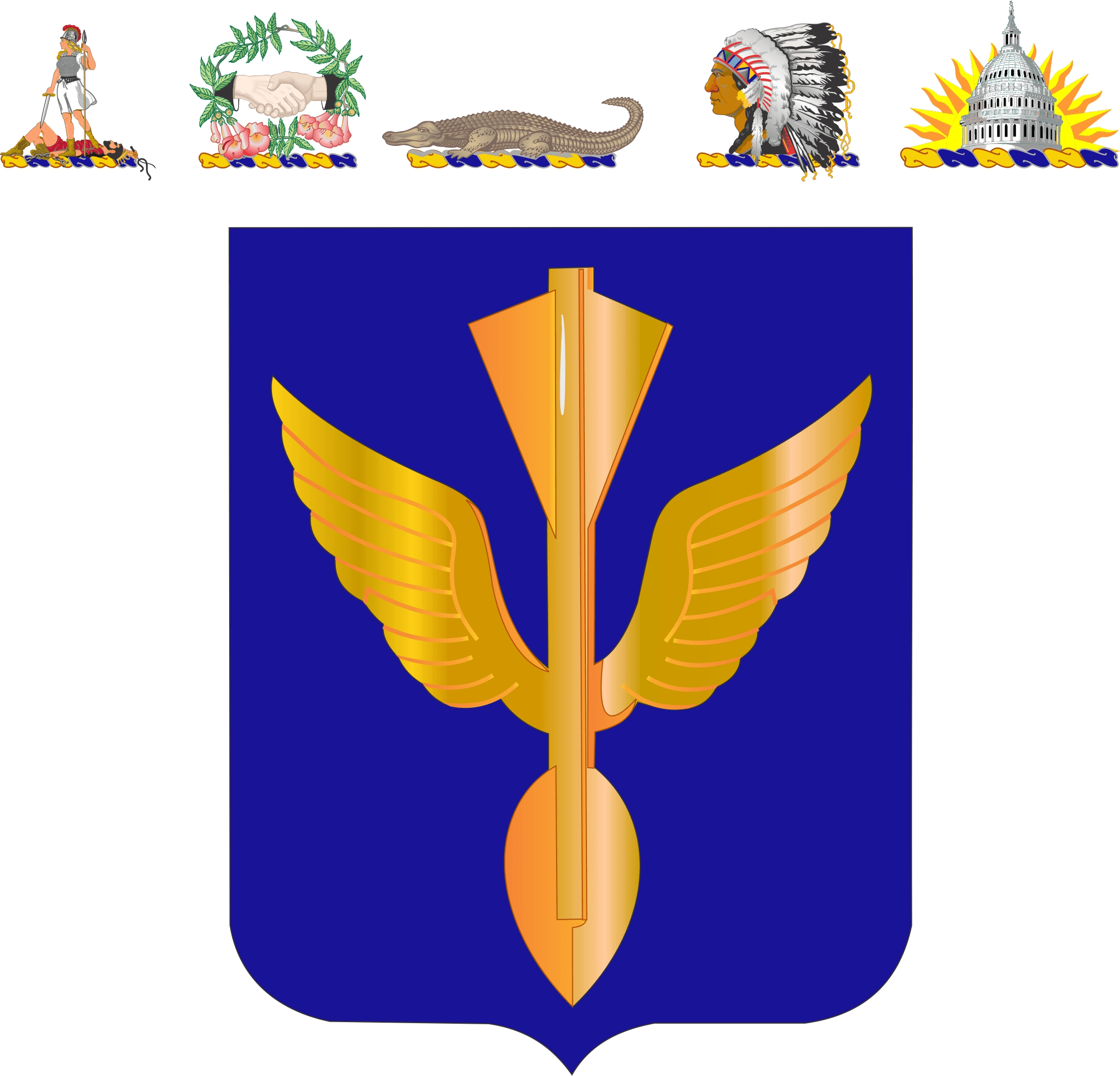
132nd Aviation
"Where Eagles Soar"

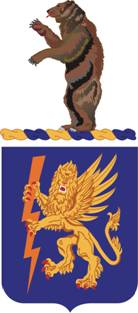
135th Aviation
"Poised to Strike"

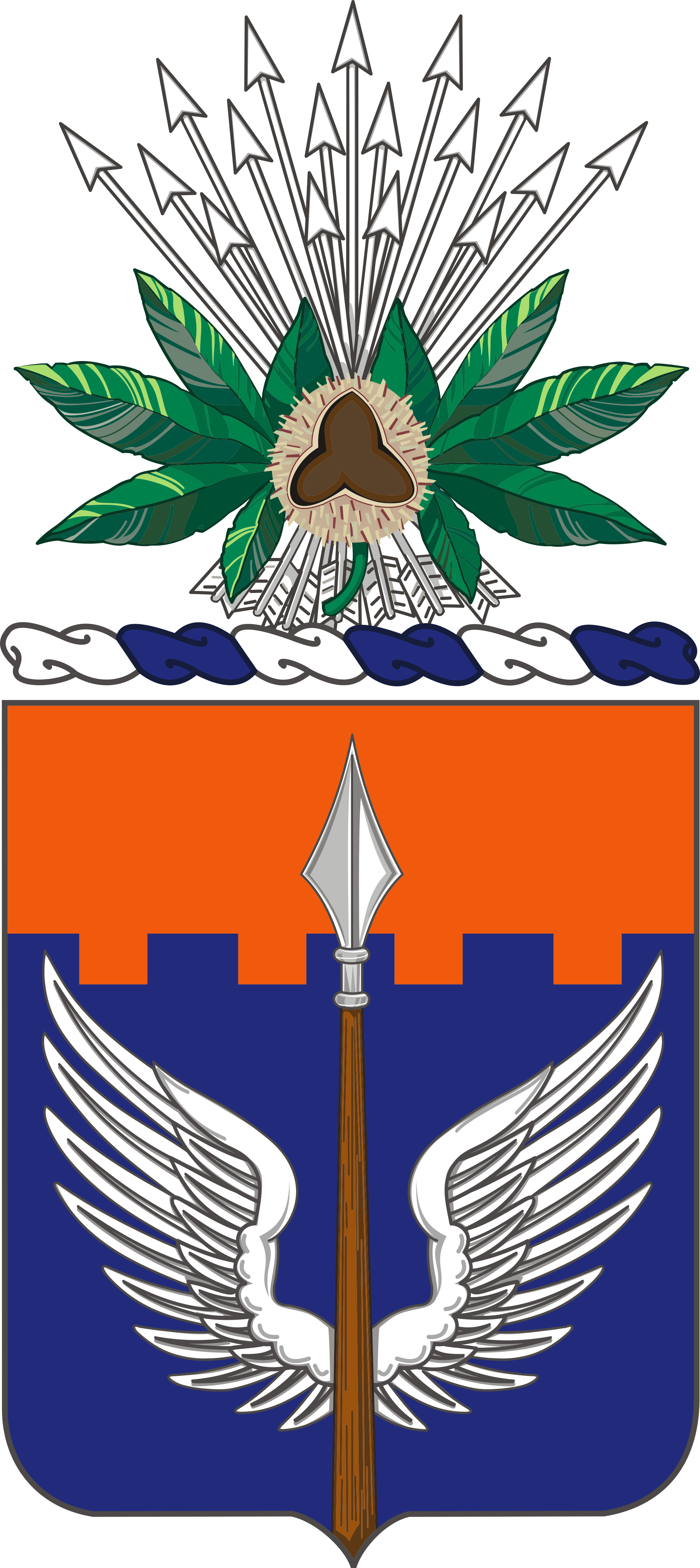
137th Aviation
"Maintaining Freedom"

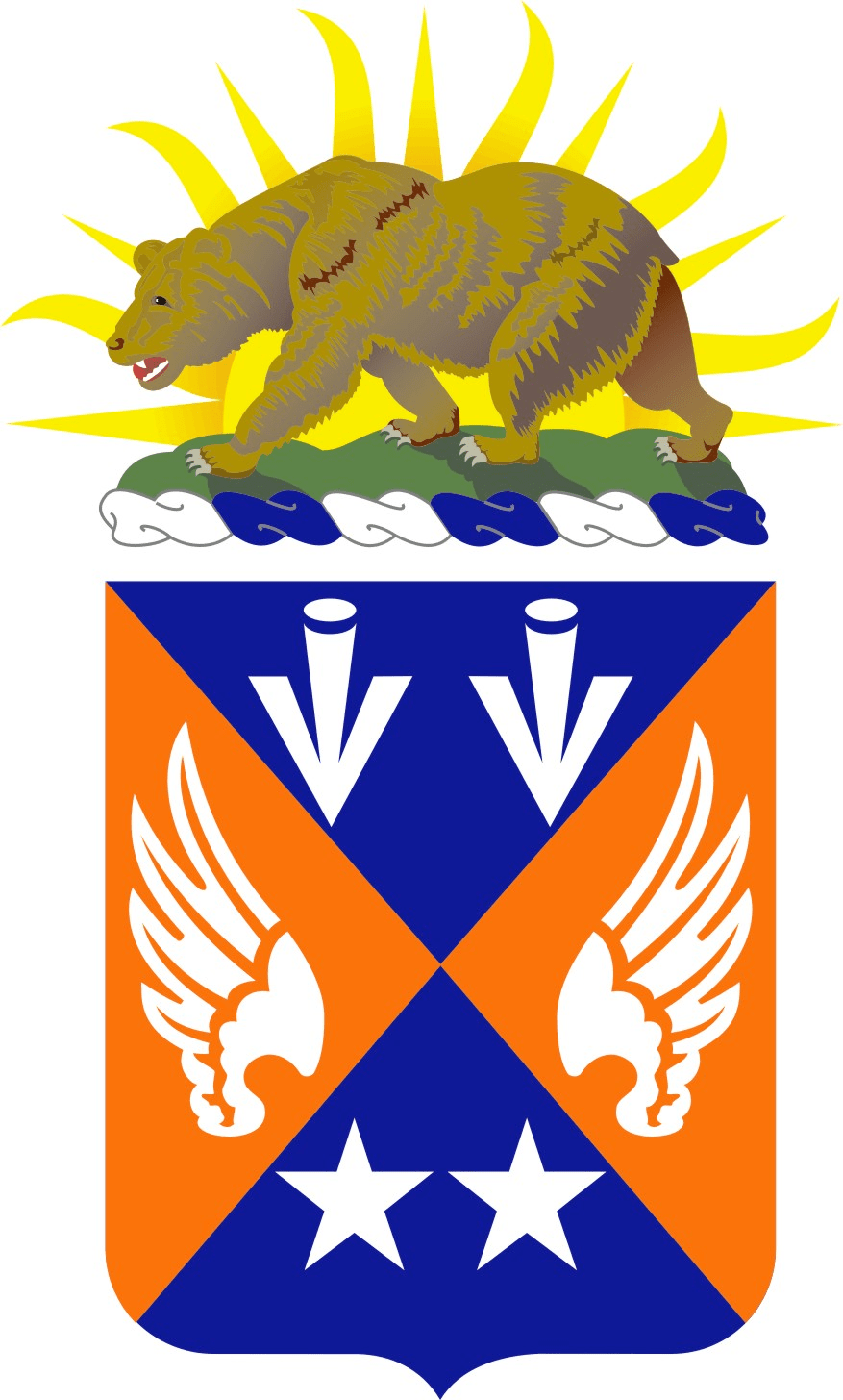
140th Aviation
"Cura et Perfectioa" (Accuracy and Perfection)

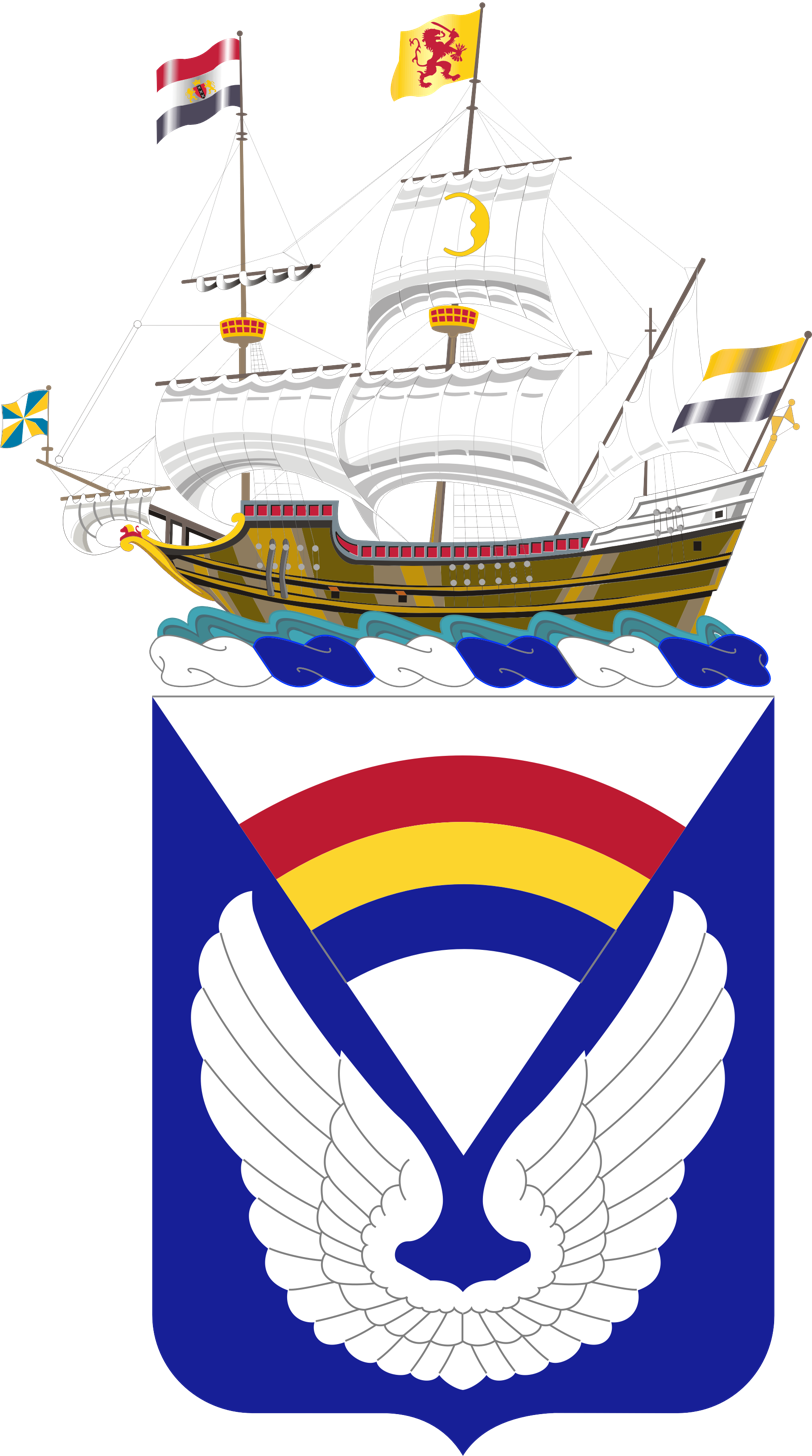
142nd Aviation
"Over the Rainbow"

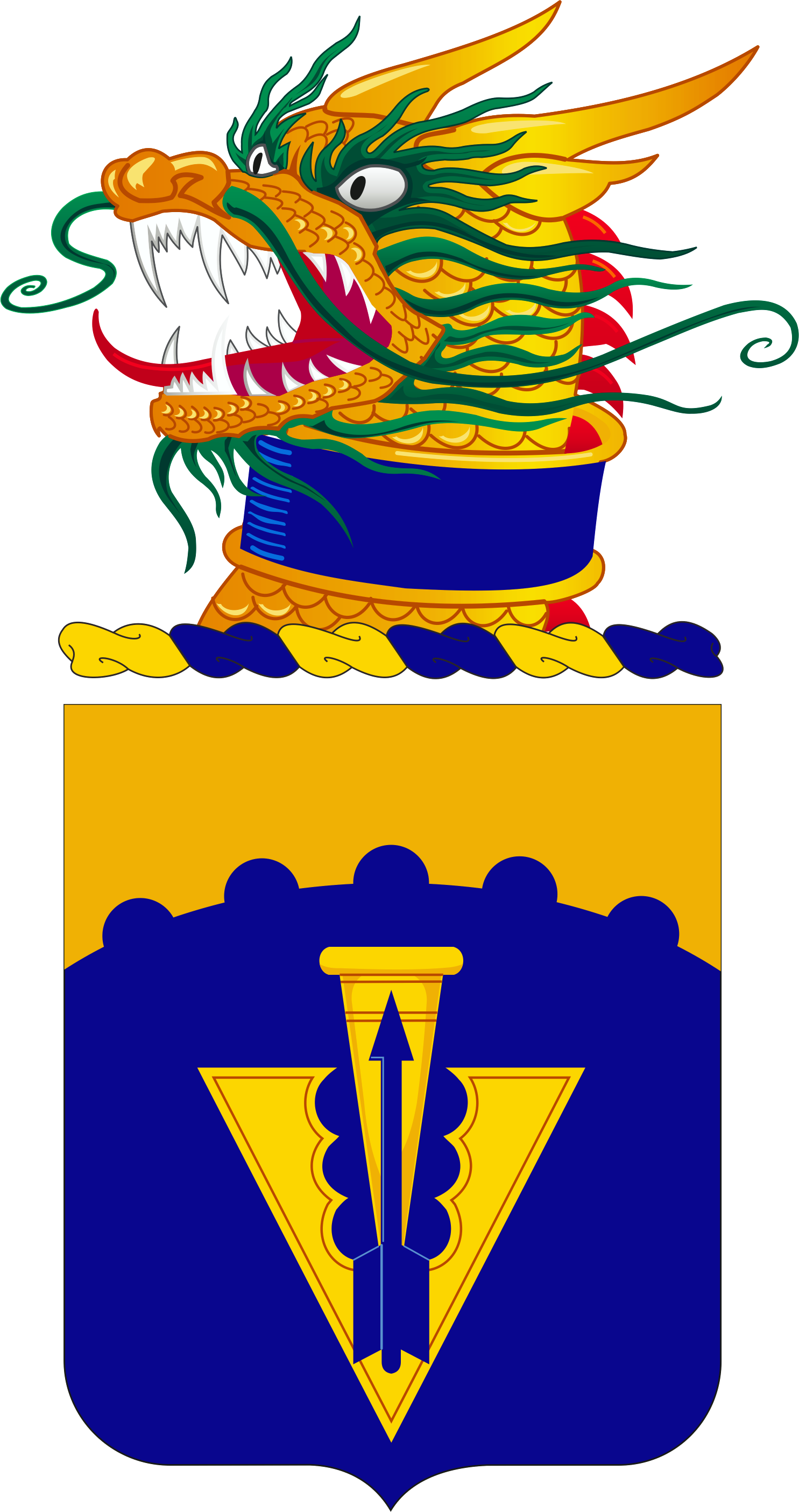
145th Aviation
"Old Warriors"

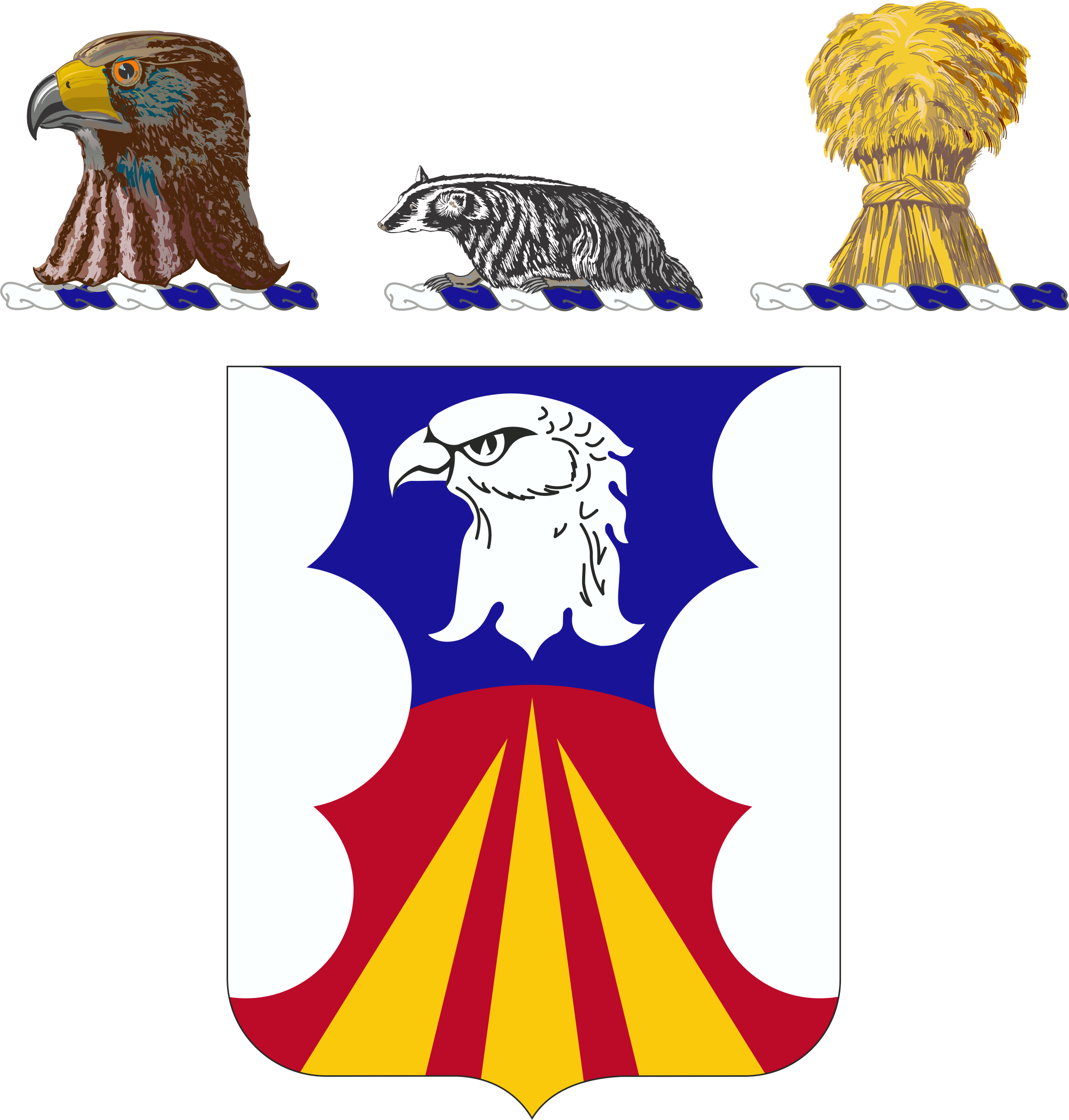
147th Aviation
"Lyncei Agminis" (The Hawk-eyed Men of the Combat Troops)

149th Aviation
"Beyond And Above"

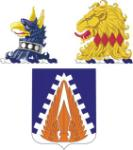
150th Aviation
"Our Guard is Up"

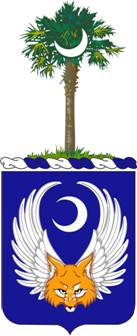
151st Aviation
"Ready to Strike"

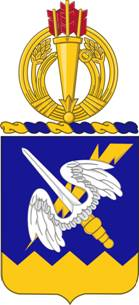
158th Aviation
"Challenge"

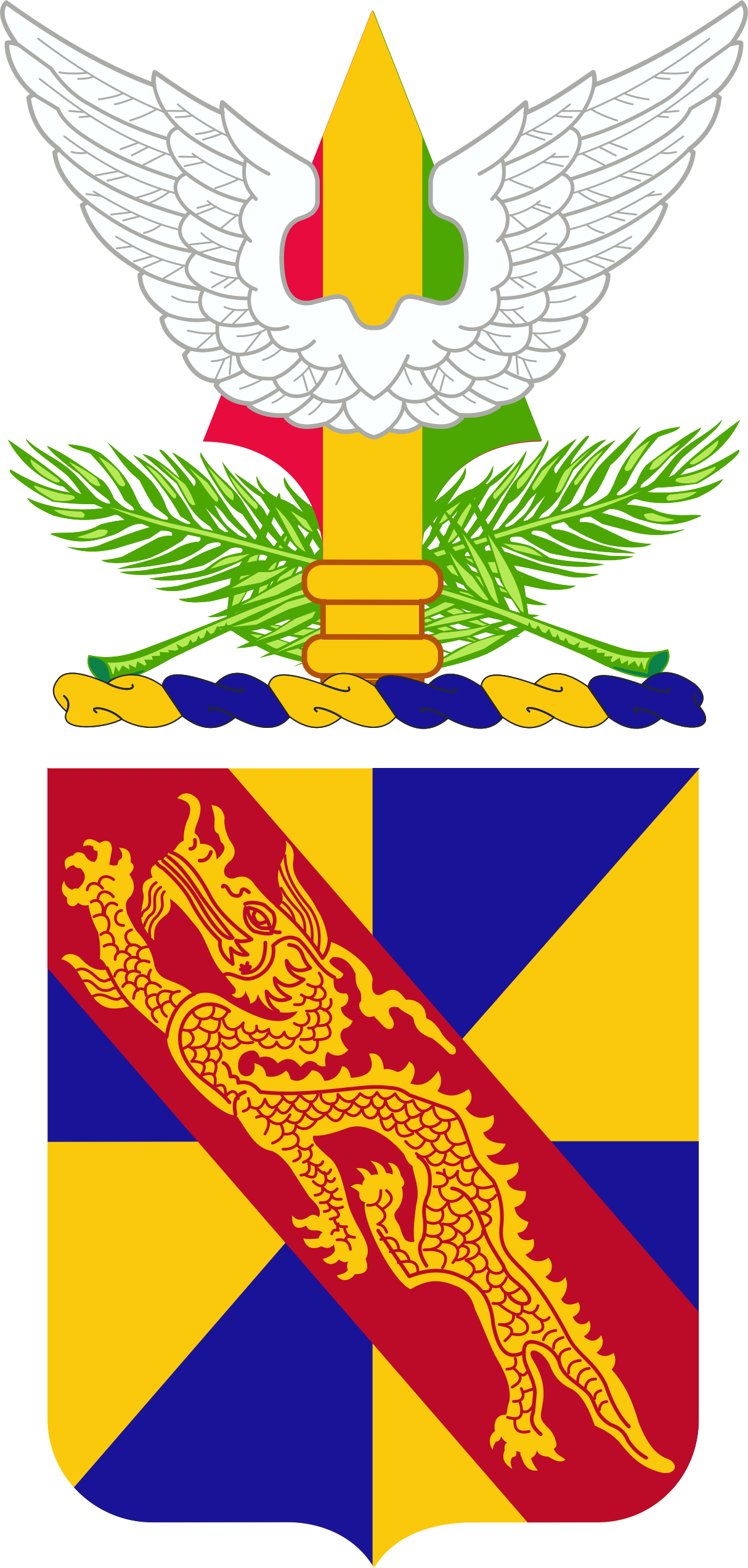
159th Aviation
"Press On"

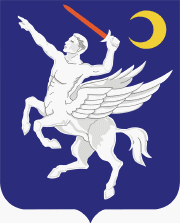
160th Special Operations Aviation
"Night Stalkers"

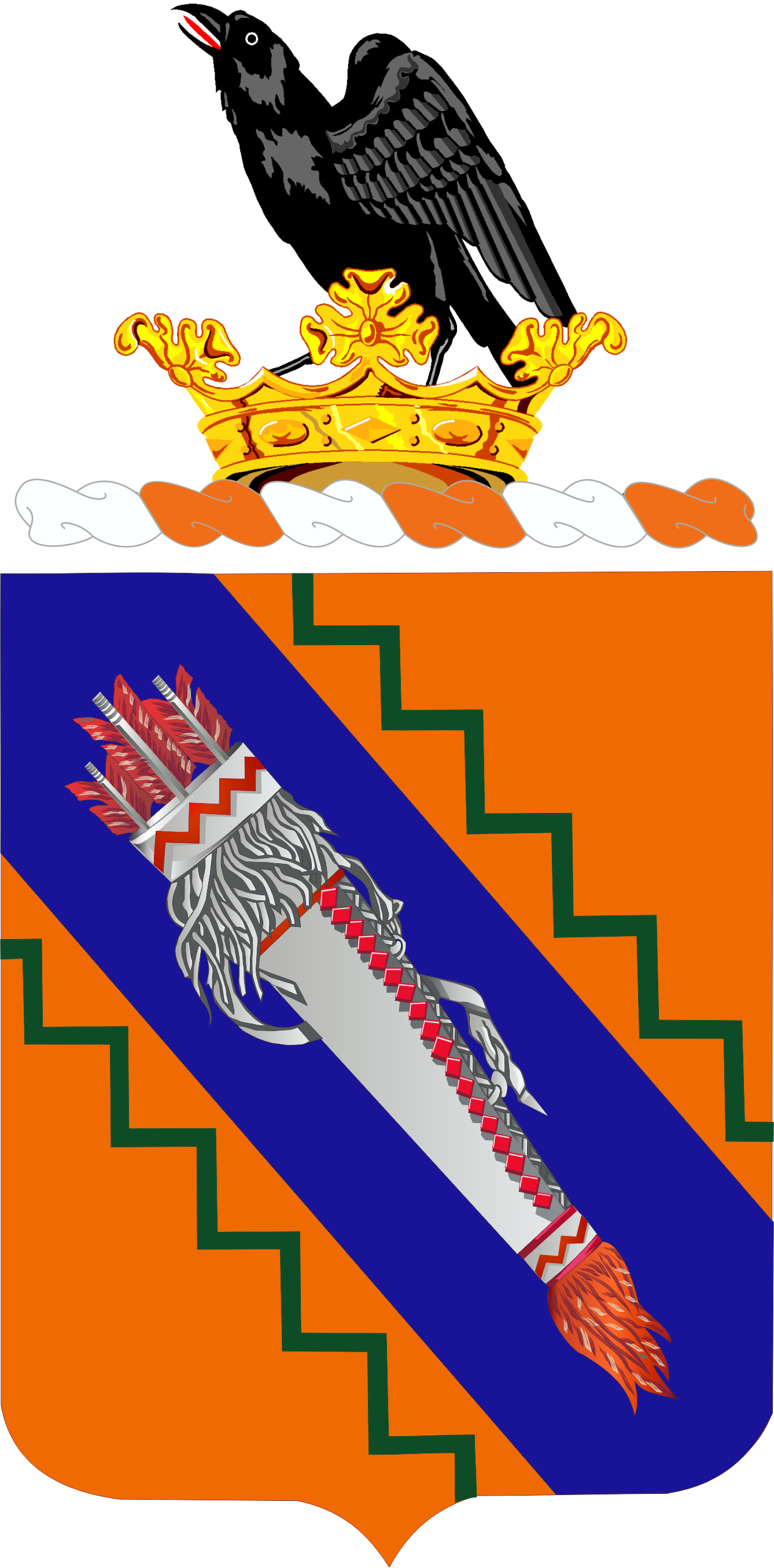
168th Aviation
"Ready When Needed"

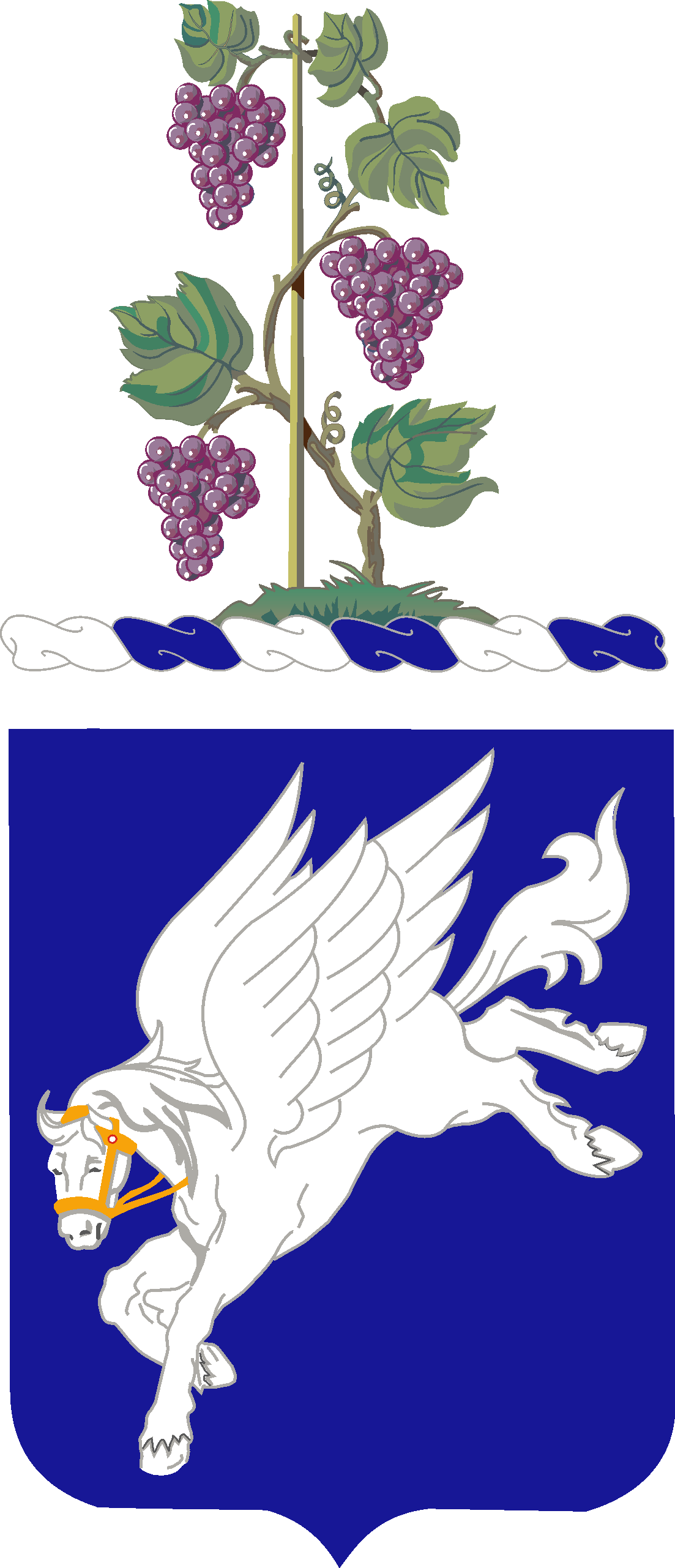
169th Aviation
"Gravissima Levans" (Lifting The Heaviest Things)

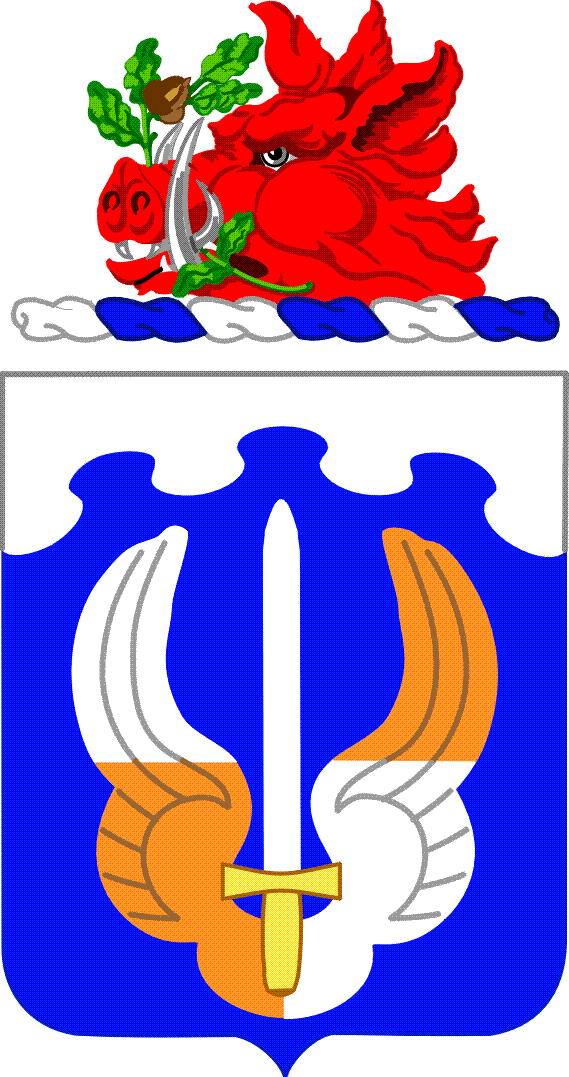
171st Aviation
"Support from Above"

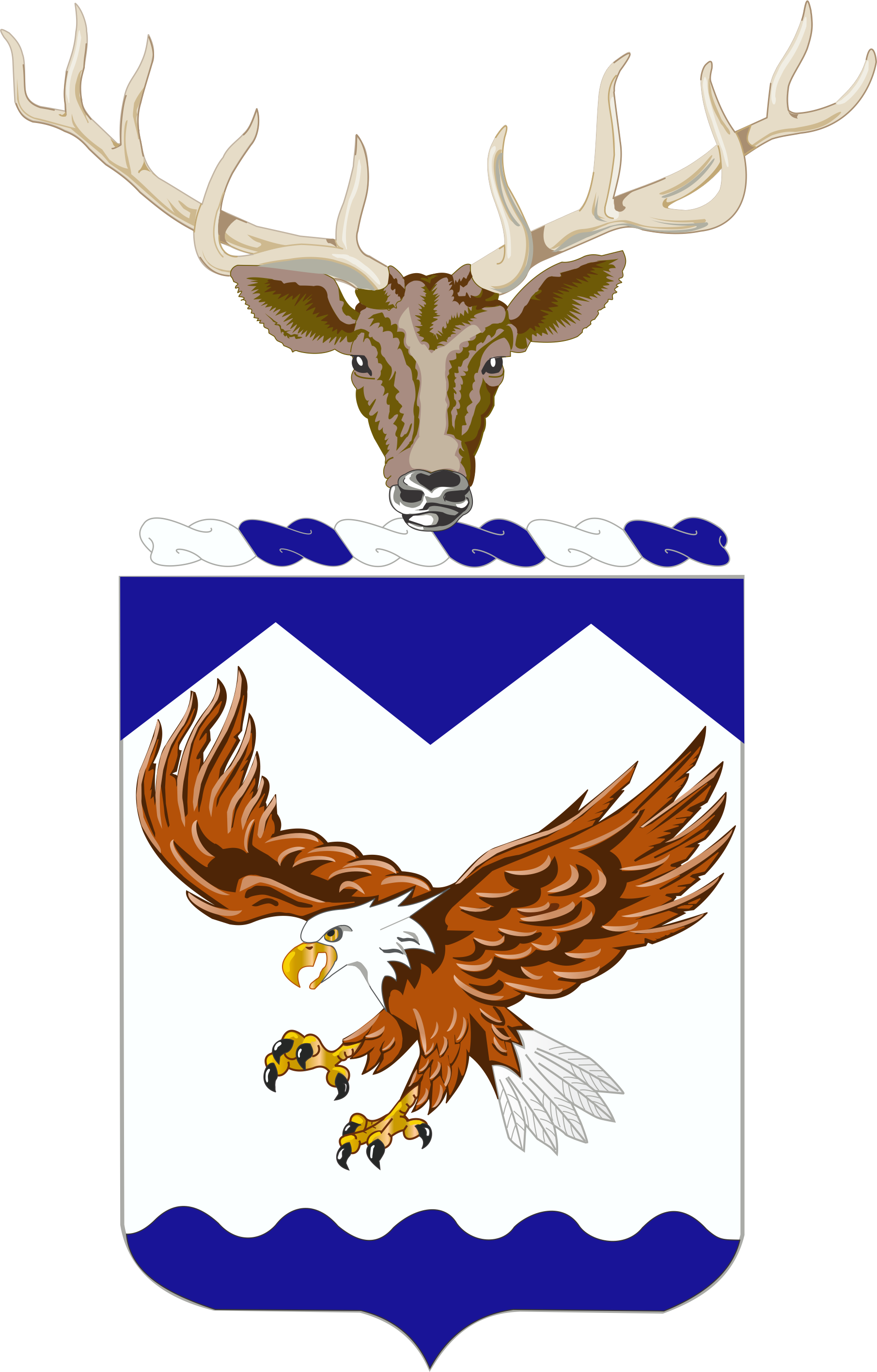
183rd Aviation
"Aves Praedae" (Birds of Prey)

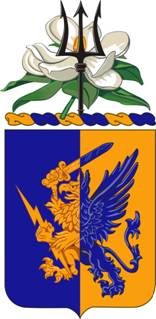
185th Aviation
"Fighting for the Force"

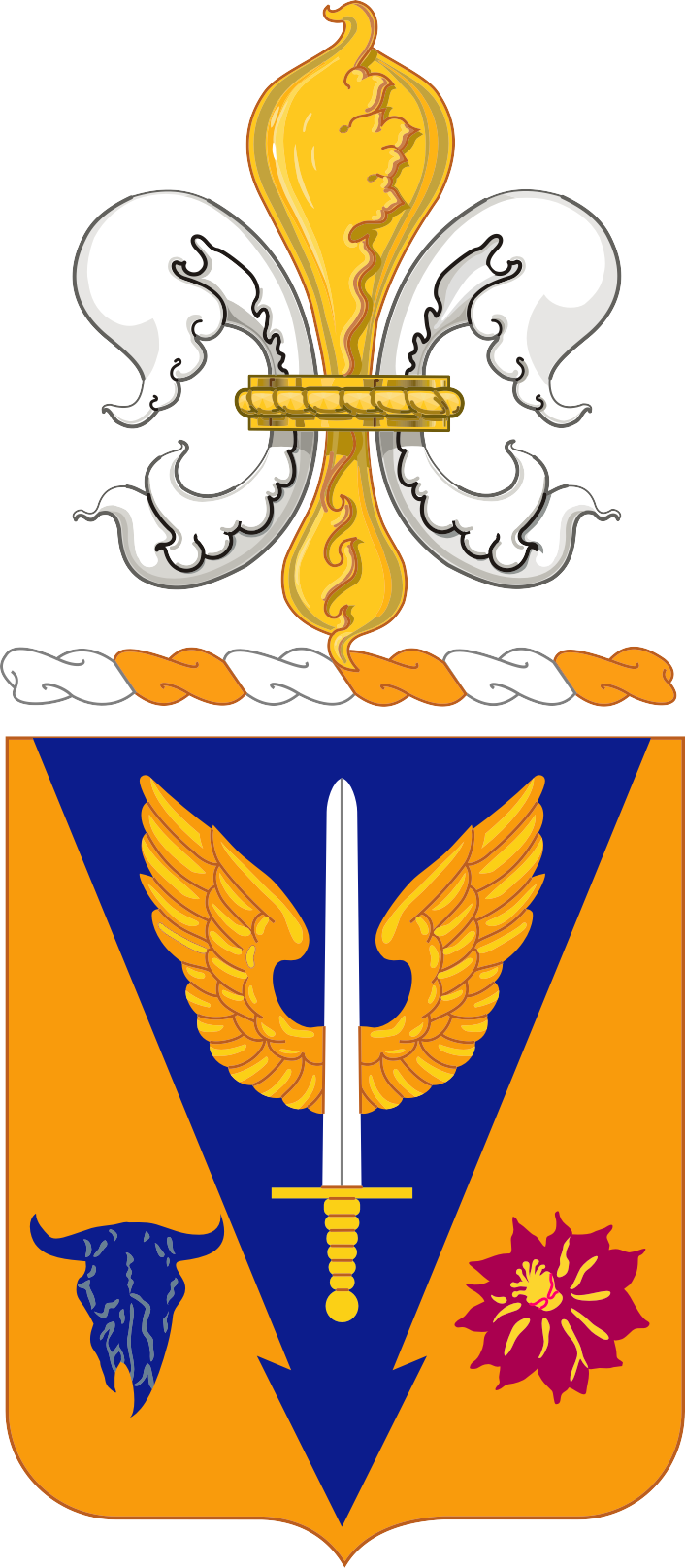
189th Aviation
"Sounds of Freedom"

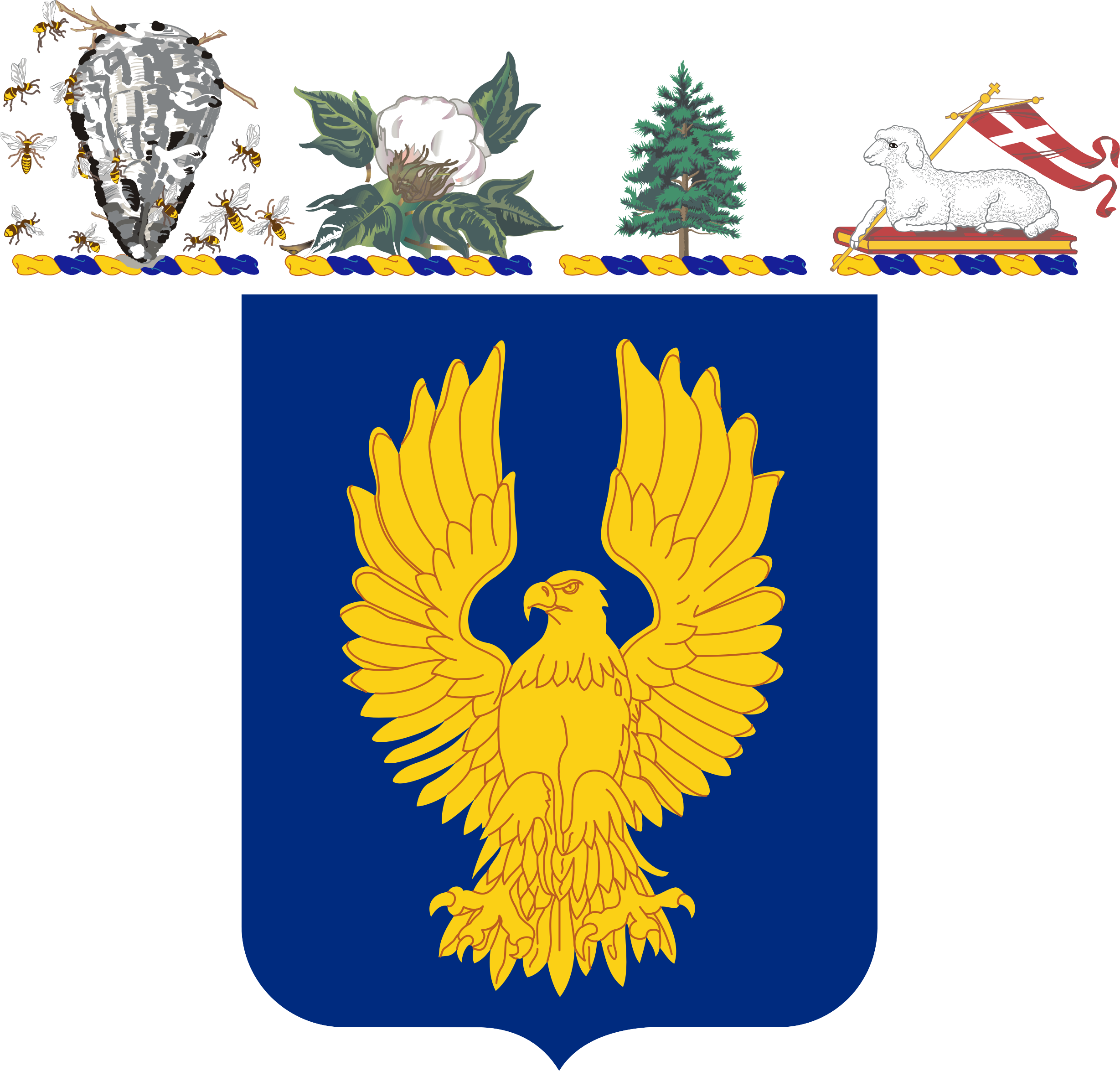
192nd Aviation
"Air Ground Control"

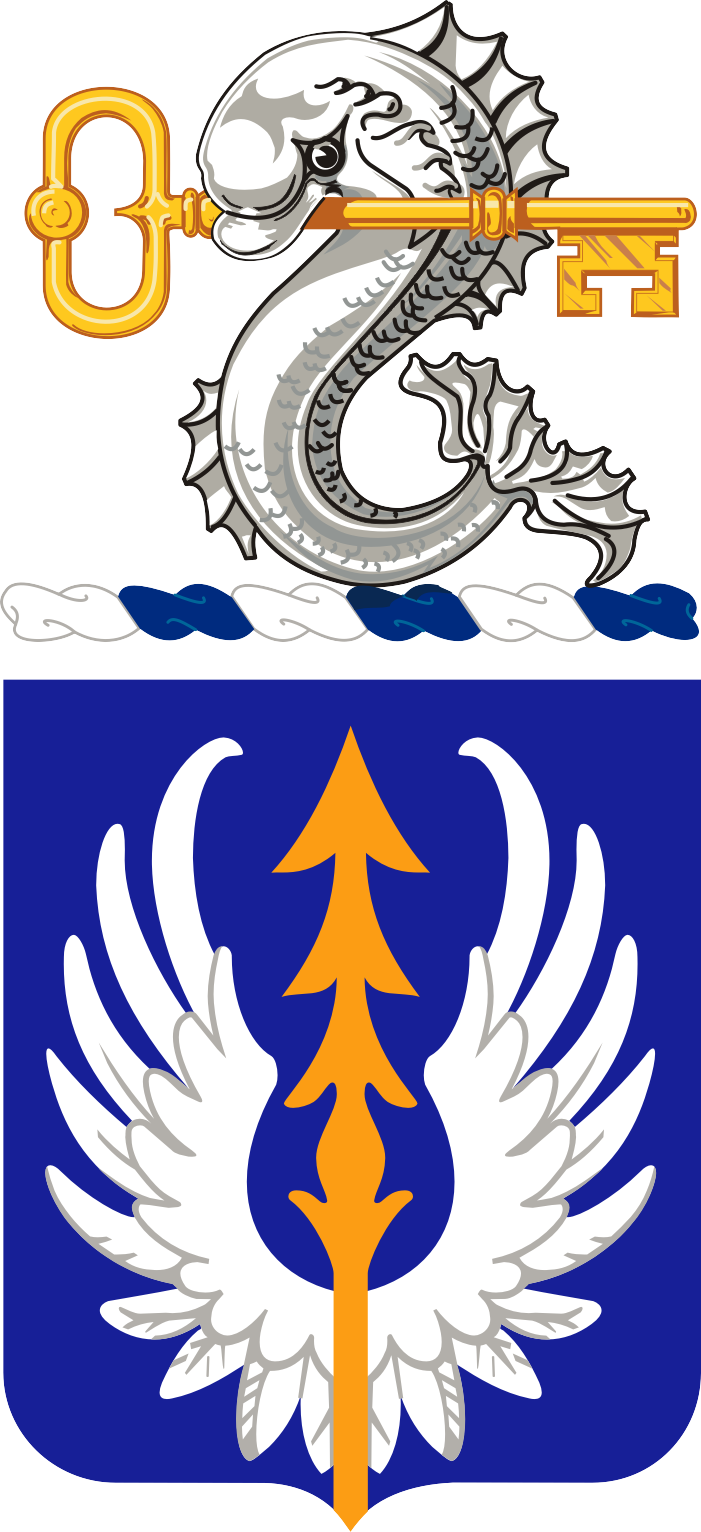
193rd Aviation
"Ku Wela Ka Hao" (Strike While the Iron is Hot)

=== 200 on ===
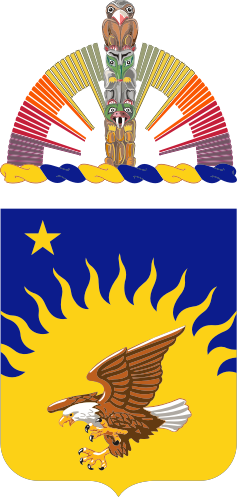
207th Aviation
"Flying to the Future"

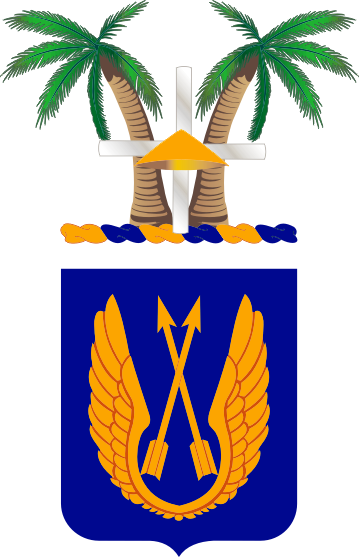
210th Aviation
"Battle Line the Sky"

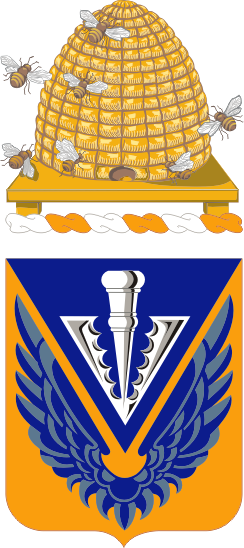
211th Aviation
"Wings of the Rockies"

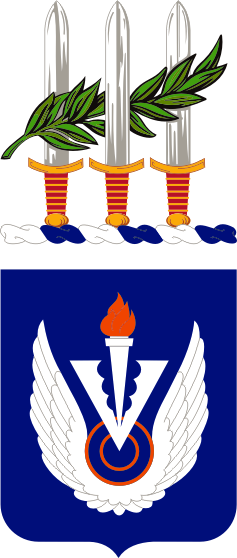
212th Aviation
"Wings of Freedom"

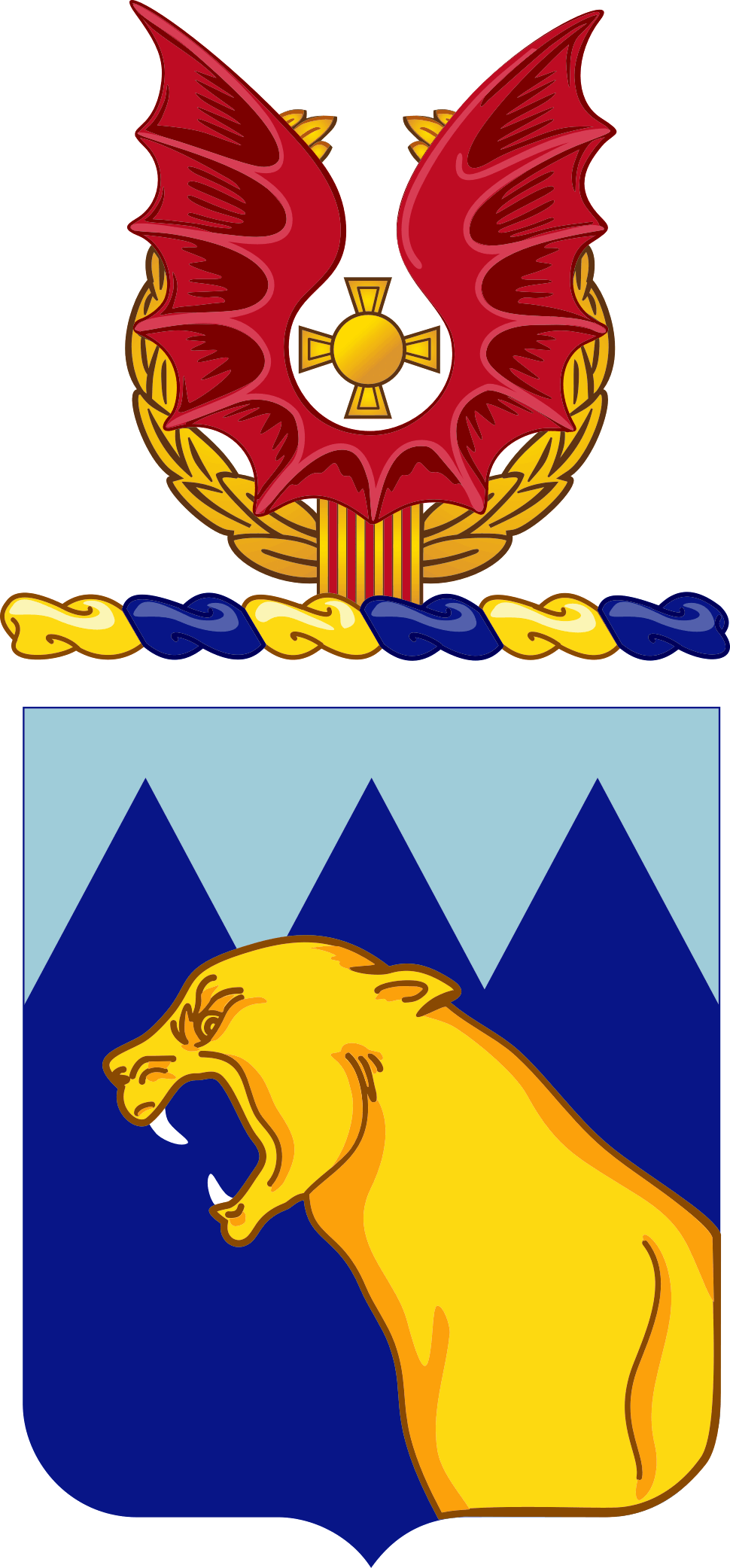
214th Aviation
"Up Tight"

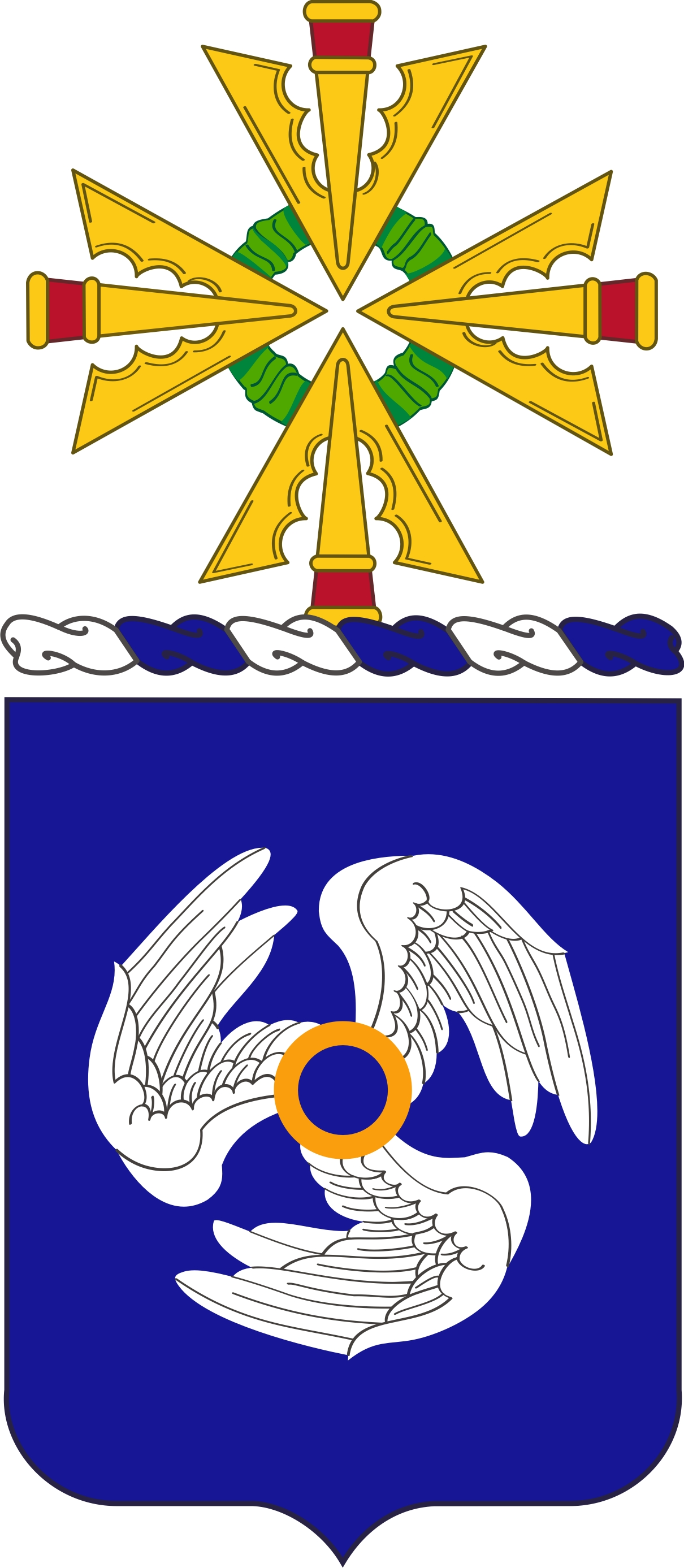
222nd Aviation
"Skymasters"

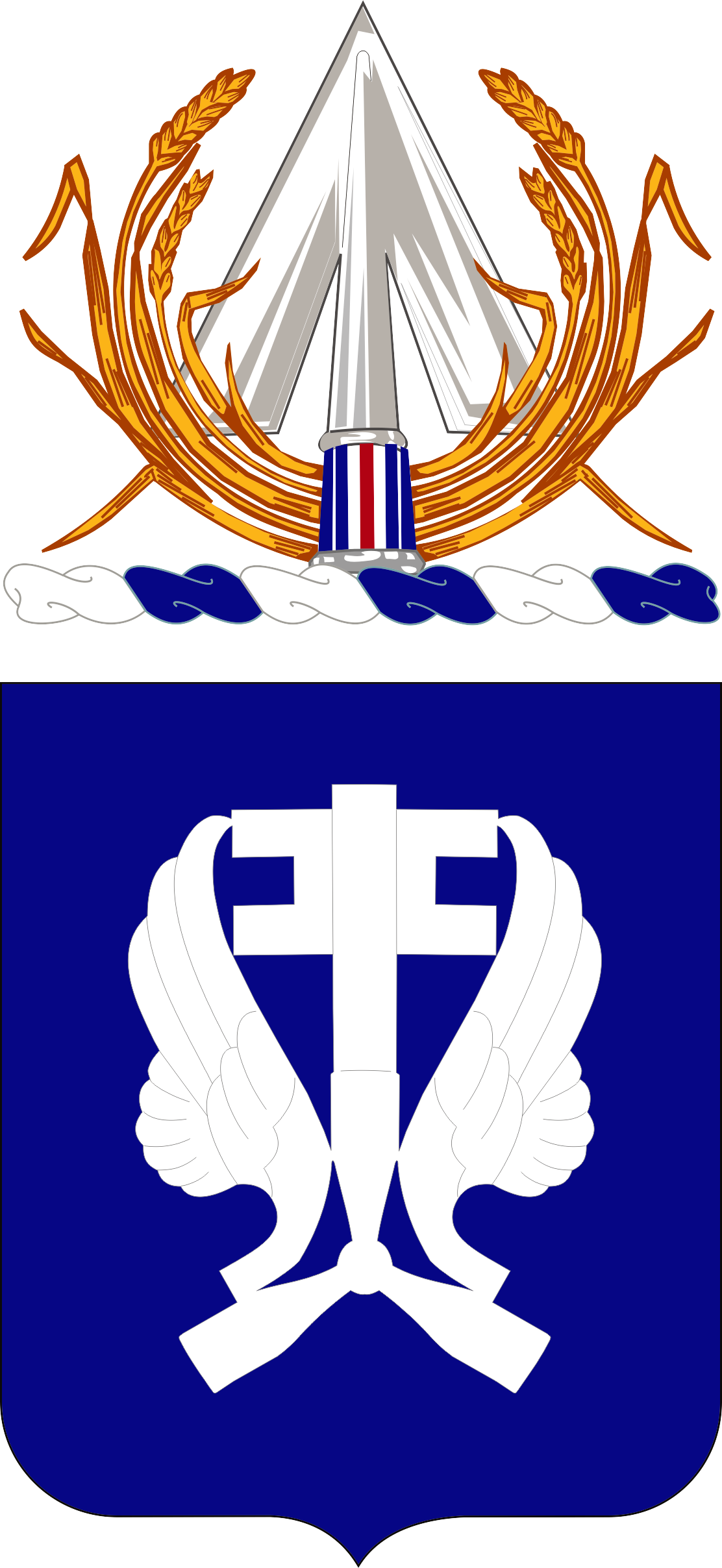
223rd Aviation
"The Mark of Excellence"

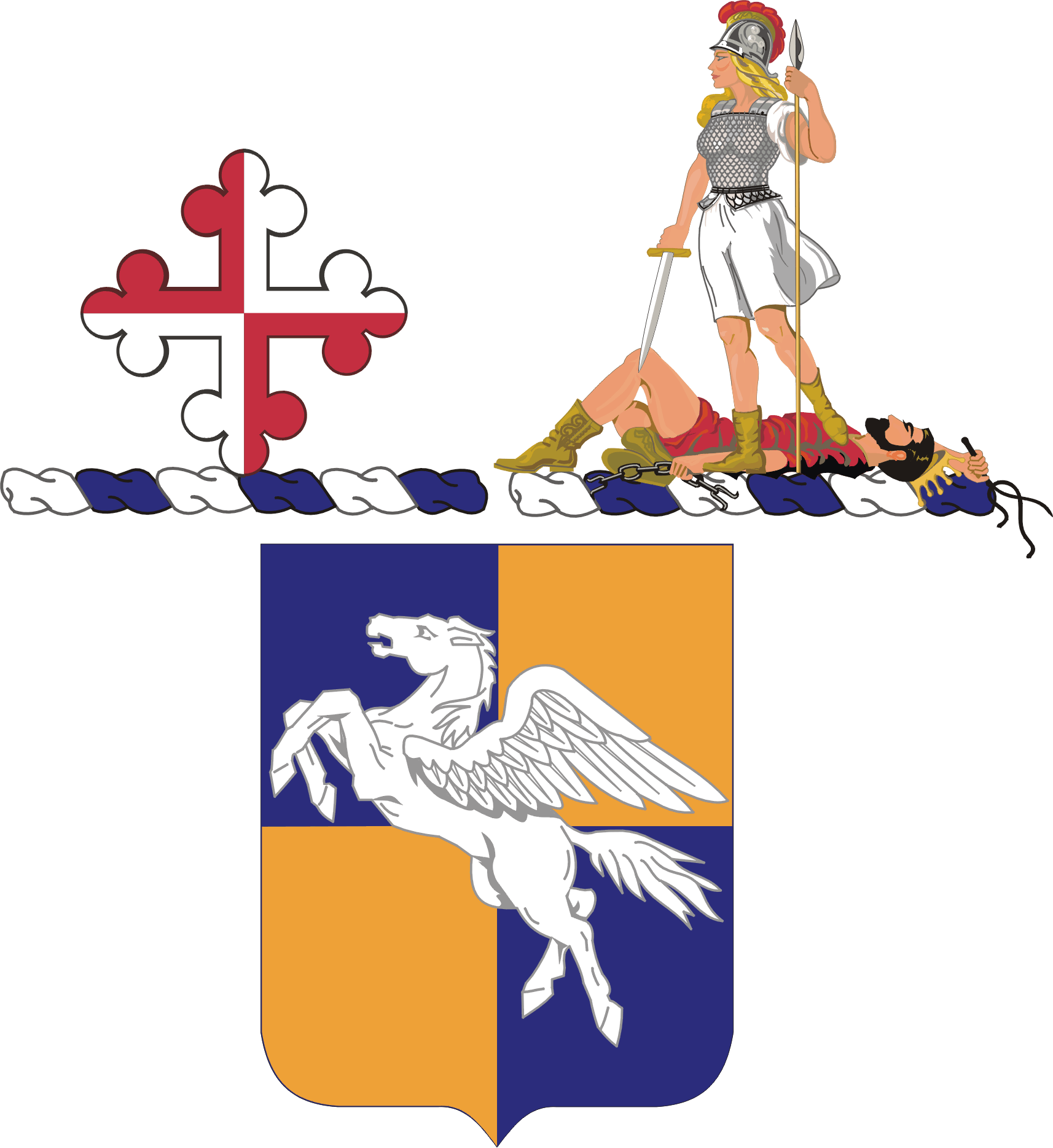
224th Aviation
"Free Dominion"

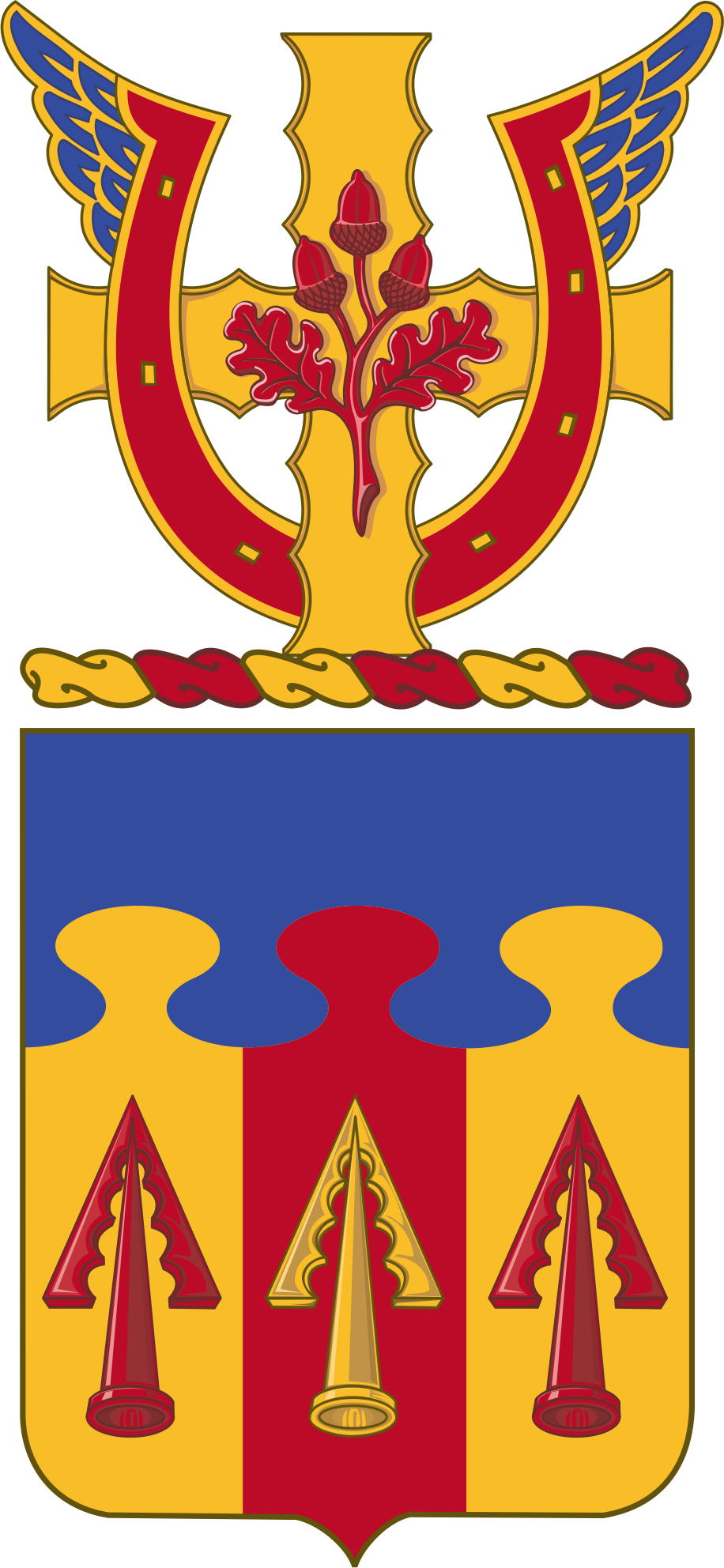
227th Aviation
"Pouvoir" (Can Do)

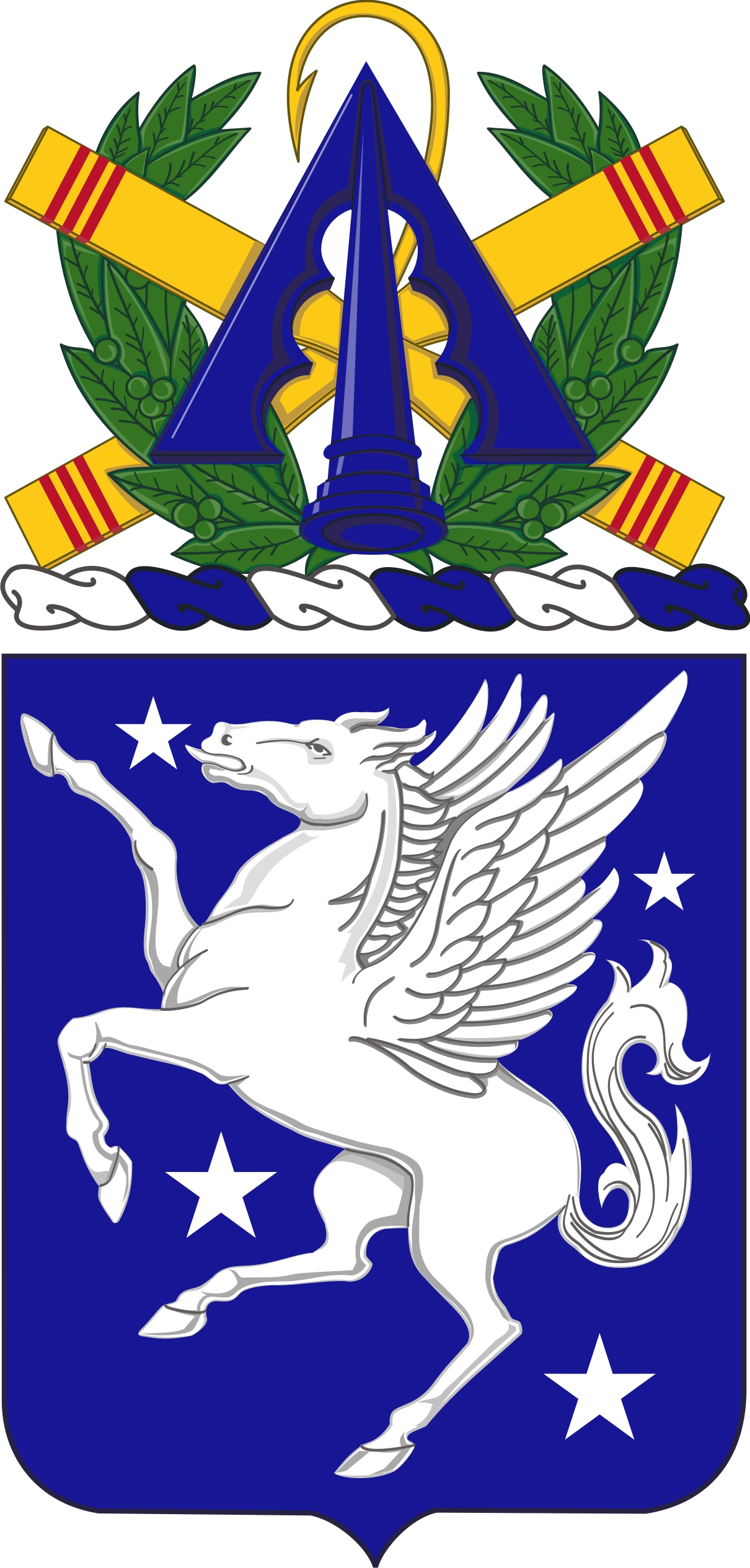
228th Aviation
"Winged Warriors"

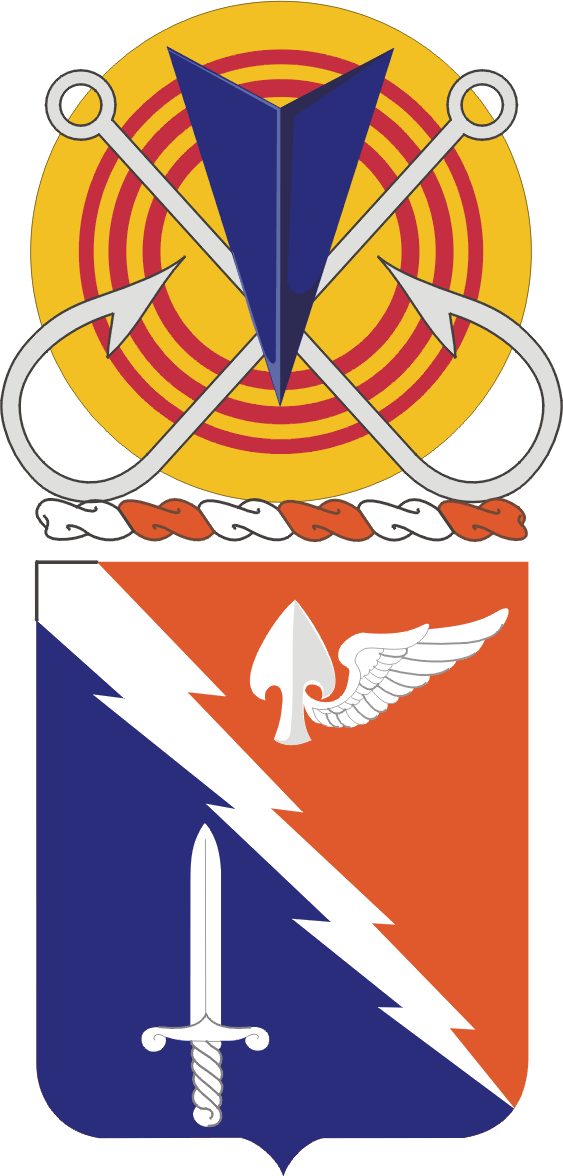
229th Aviation
"Winged Assault"

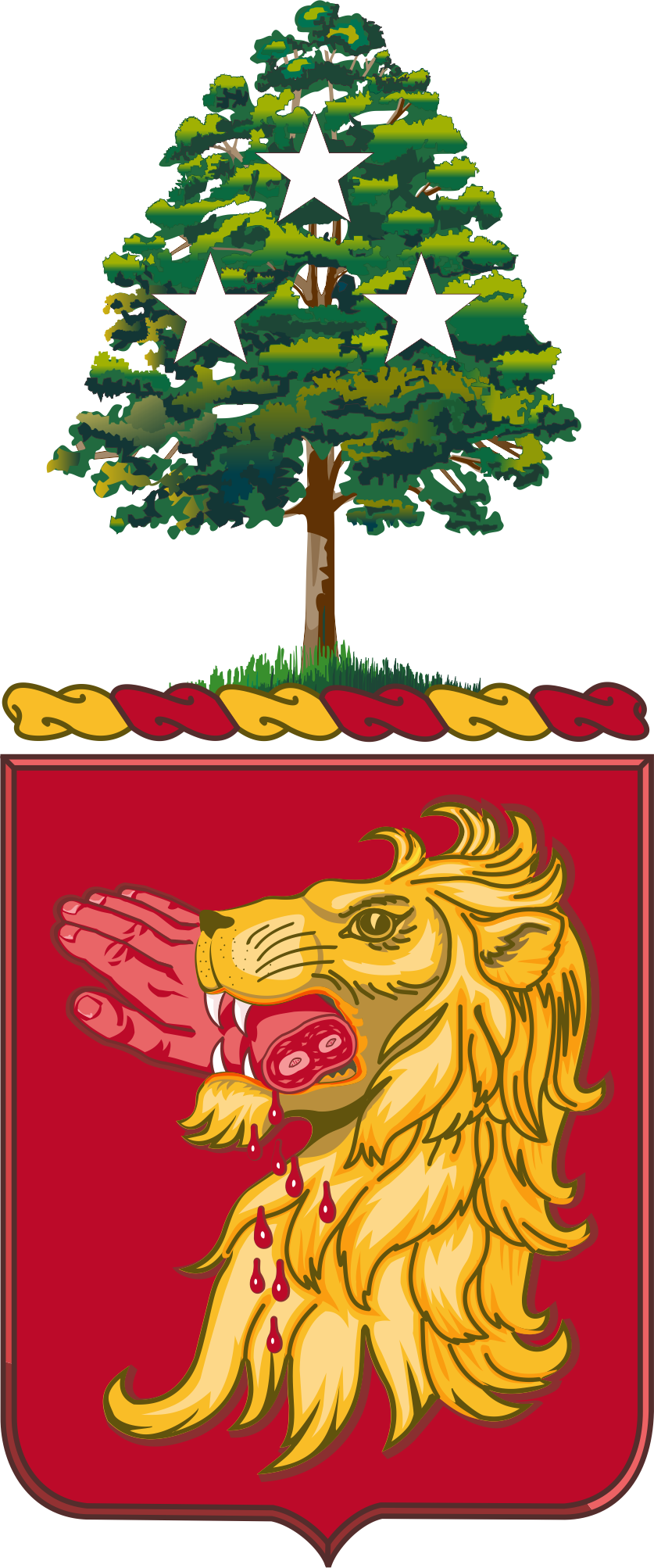
230th Aviation
"Speed, Strength, Stamina"

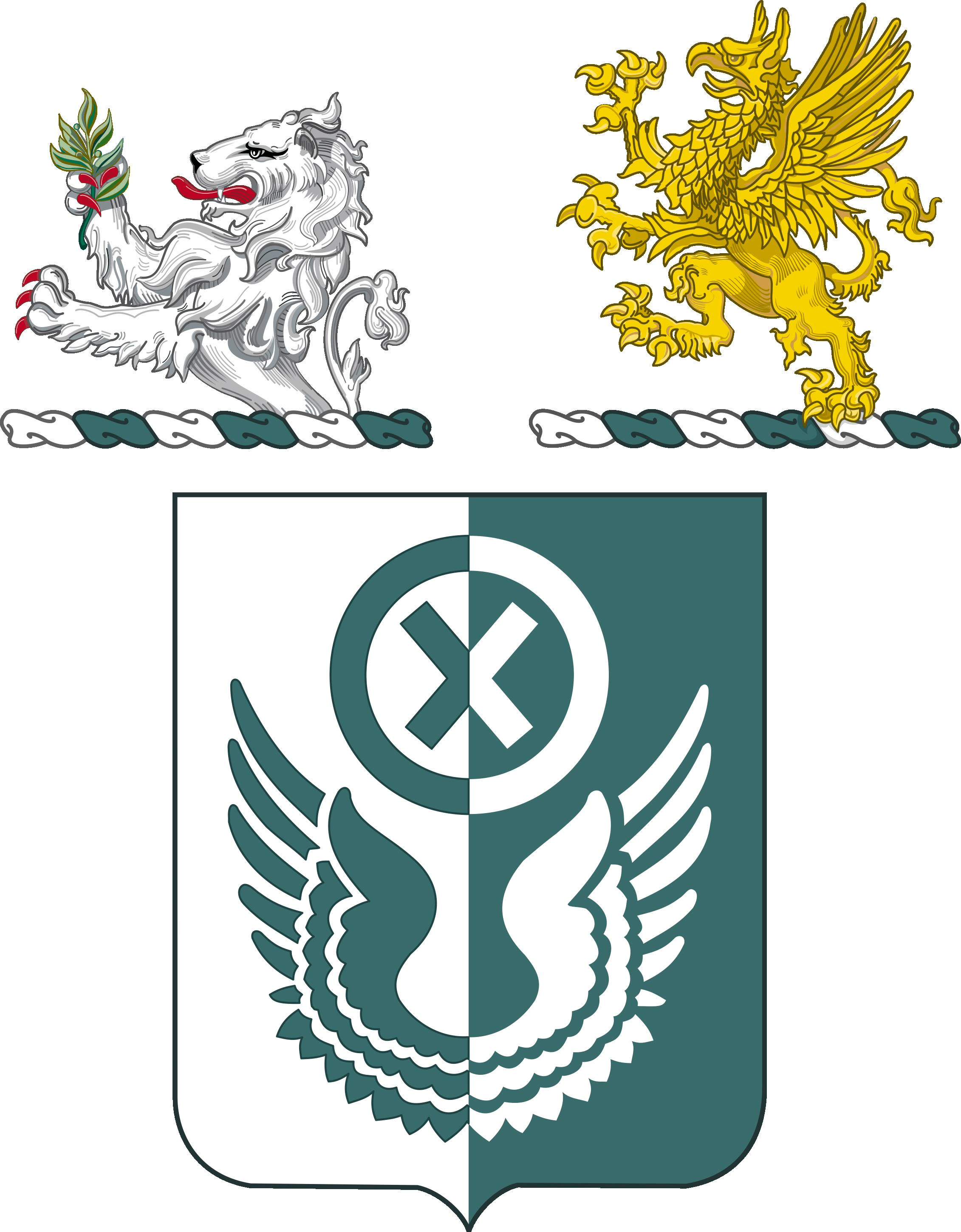
238th Aviation
"Eye of the Cyclone"

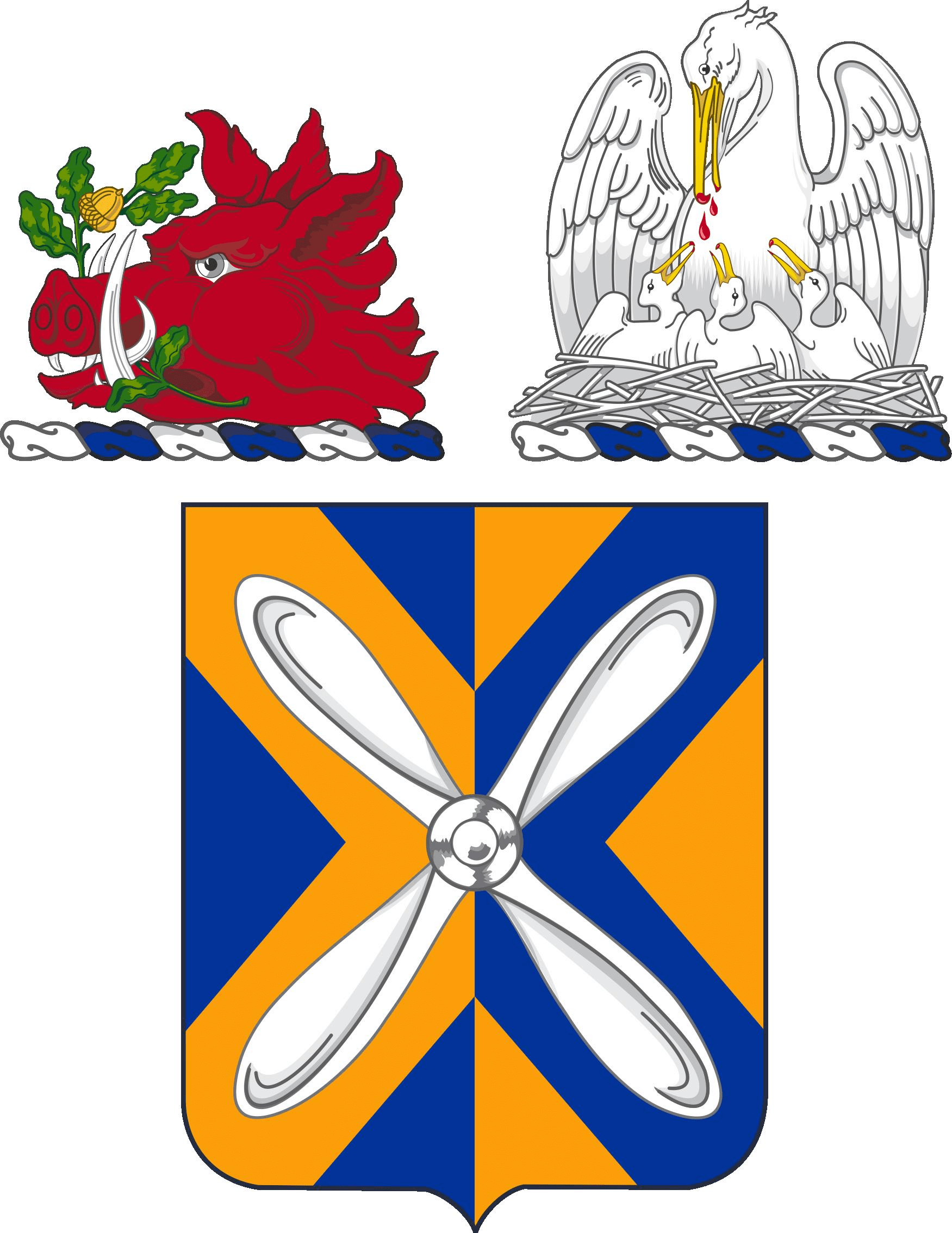
244th Aviation
"Ready Response"

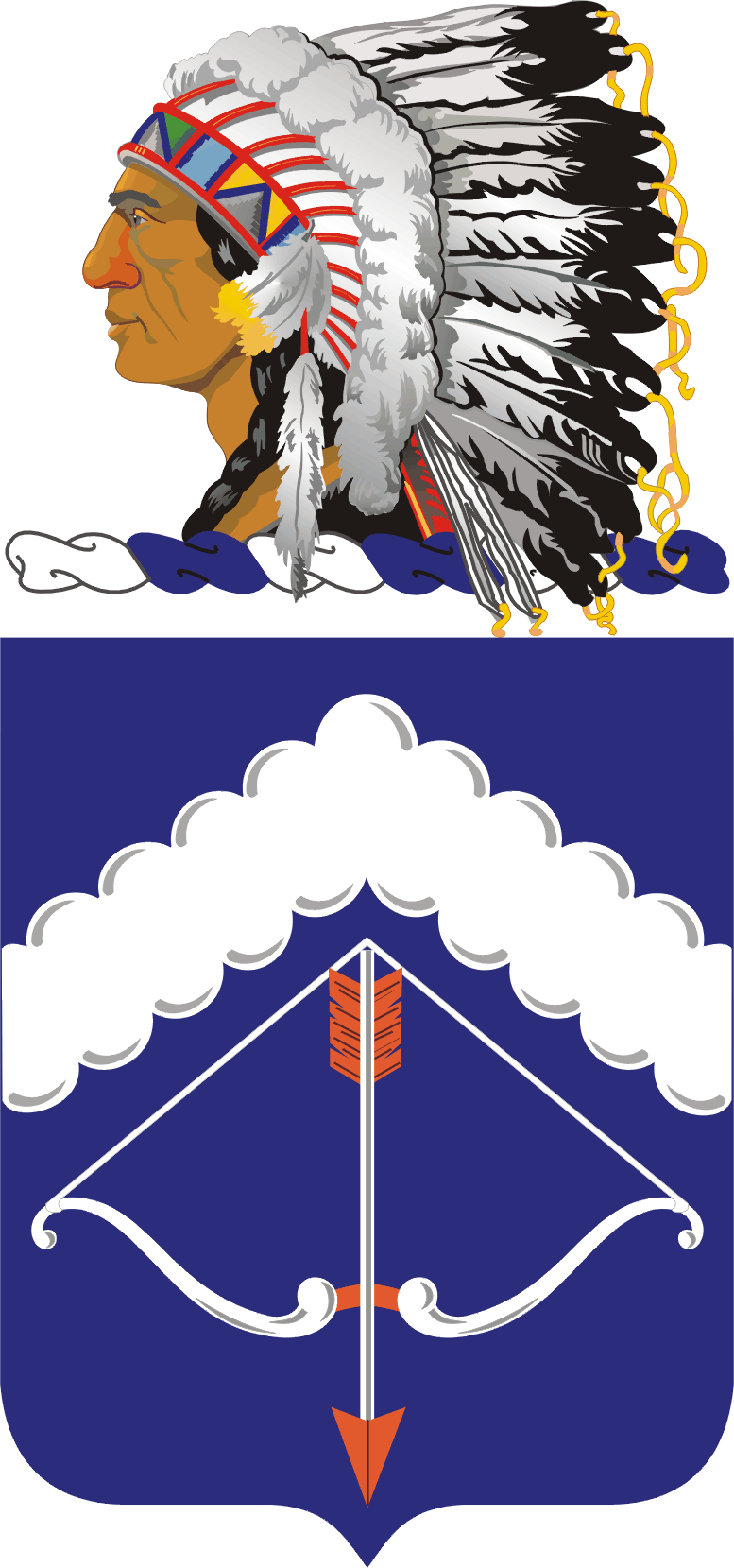
245th Aviation
"Not for Ourselves Alone"

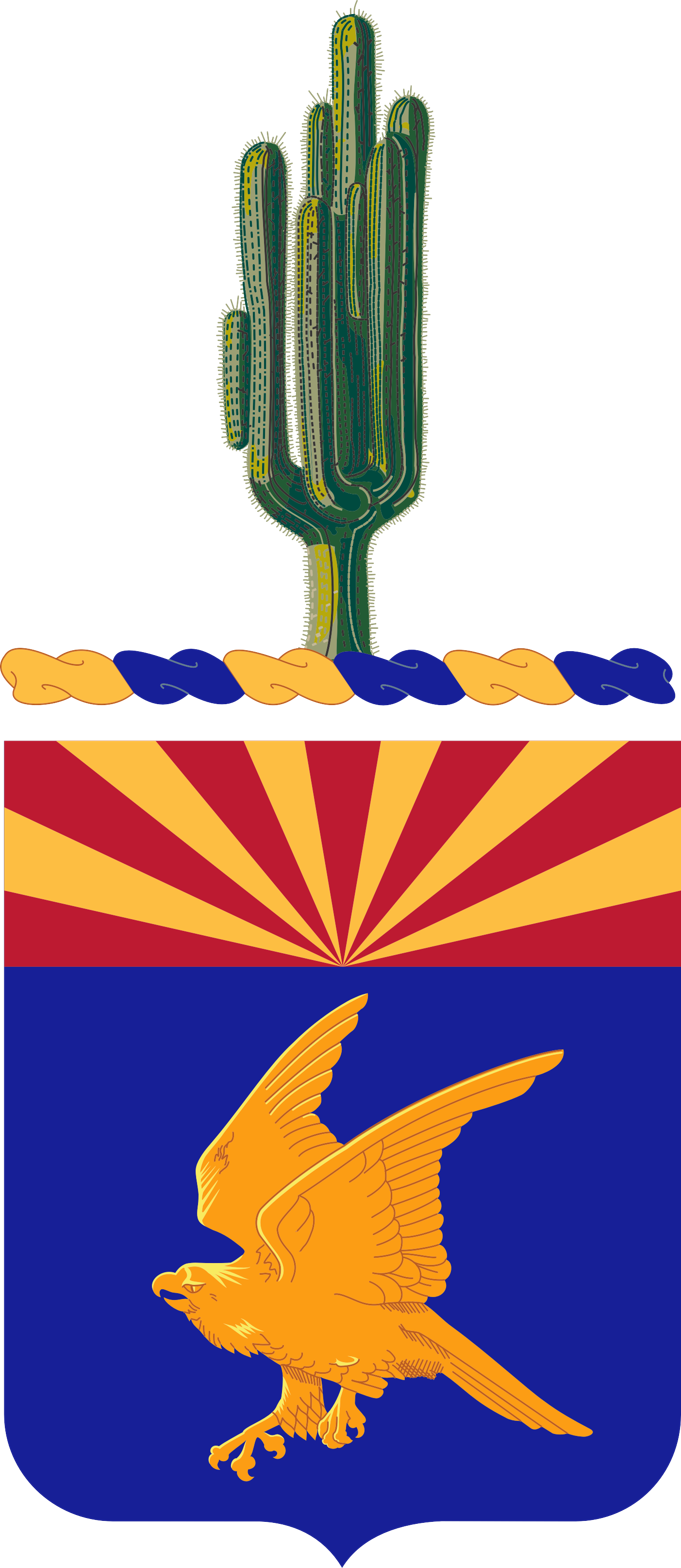
285th Aviation
"Desert Hawks"

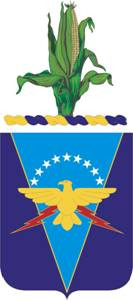
376th Aviation
"Appugno Formido" (Fight Against Terror)

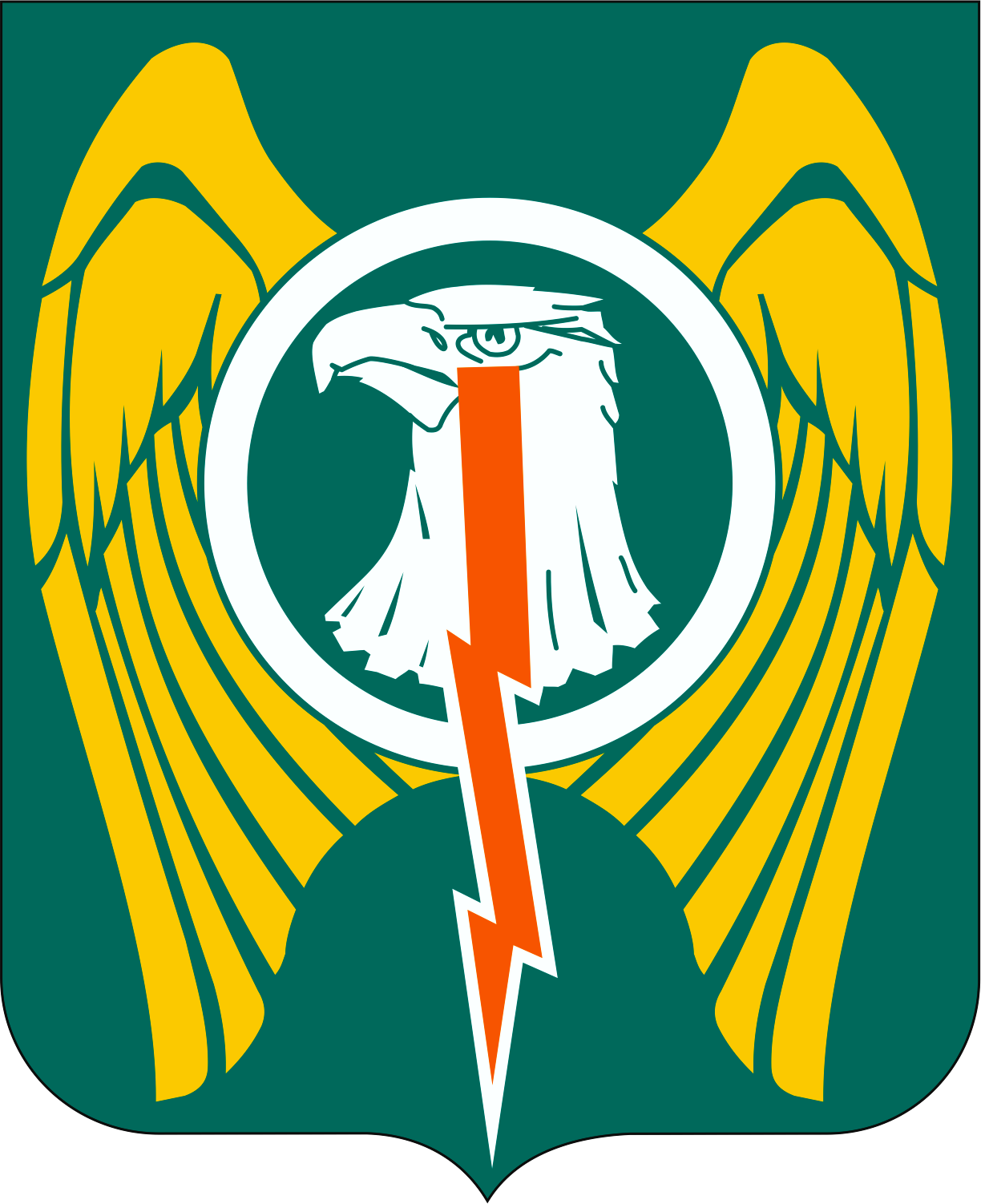
501st Aviation
"The Warding Eye"

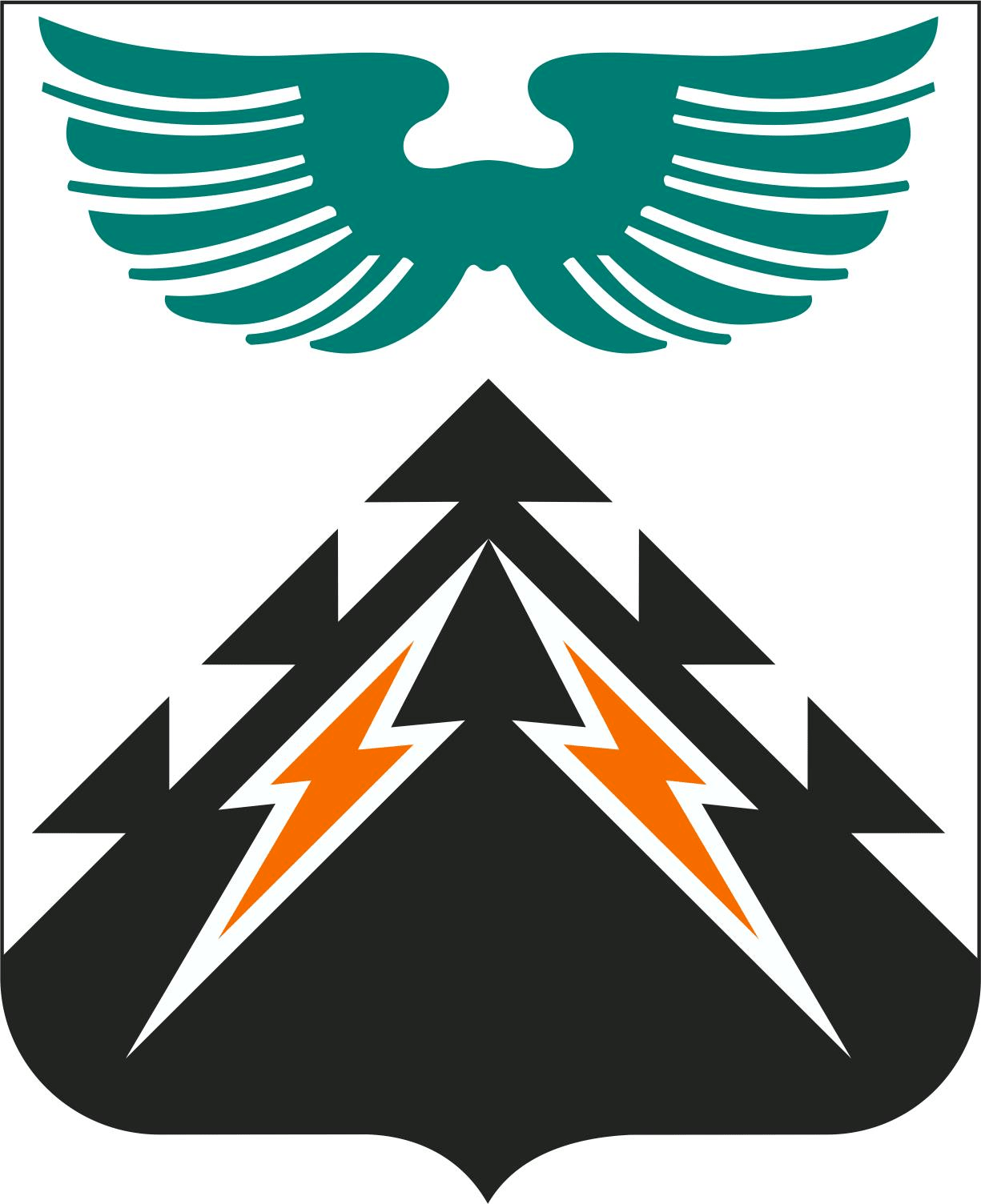
502nd Aviation
"First to Know"

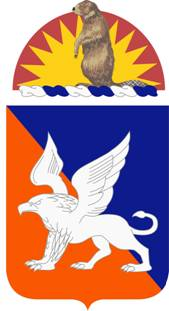
641st Aviation
"Enduring Vigilance"

== Cavalry units ==
=== 1 to 100 ===
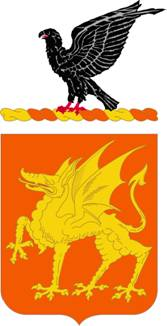
1st Cavalry
(formerly 1st Armor)
"Animo et Fide" (Courageous and Faithful)
"1st Regiment of Dragoons"

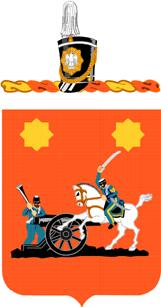
2nd Cavalry
"Toujors Pret" (Always Ready)
"Second Dragoons"

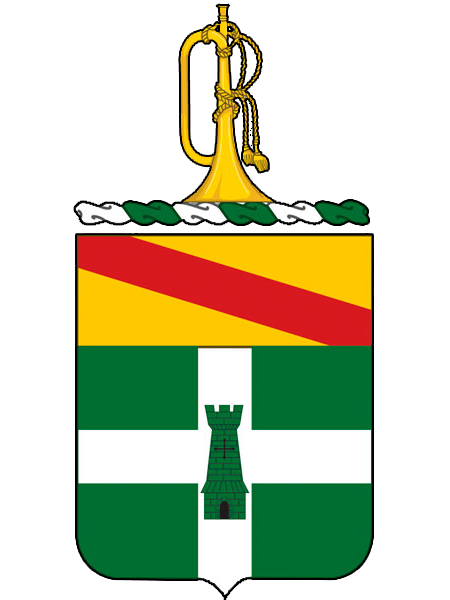
3d Cavalry
"Blood and Steel"
"Brave Rifles"

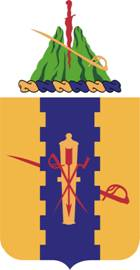
4th Cavalry
"Prepared and Loyal"

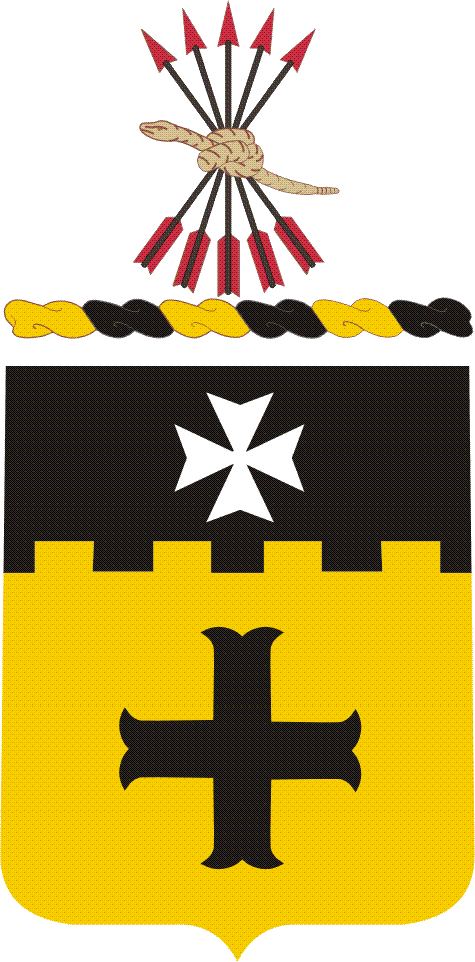
5th Cavalry
"Loyalty Courage"
"Black Knights"

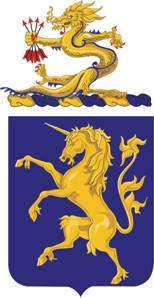
6th Cavalry
"Ducit Amor Patrie" (Led by Love of Country)

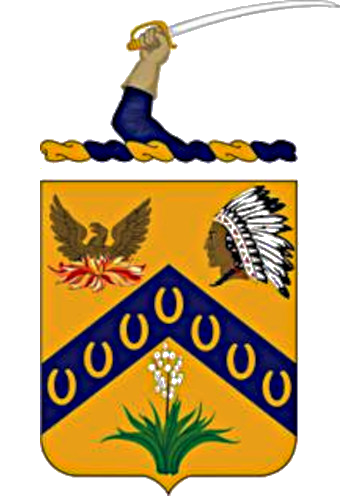
7th Cavalry
"The Seventh First"
"Garry Owen"

8th Cavalry
"Honor and Courage"

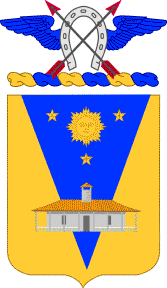
9th Cavalry
"We Can We Will"

10th Cavalry
"Ready And Forward"
"Buffalo Soldiers"

11th Cavalry
"Allons"
"Blackhorse Regiment"

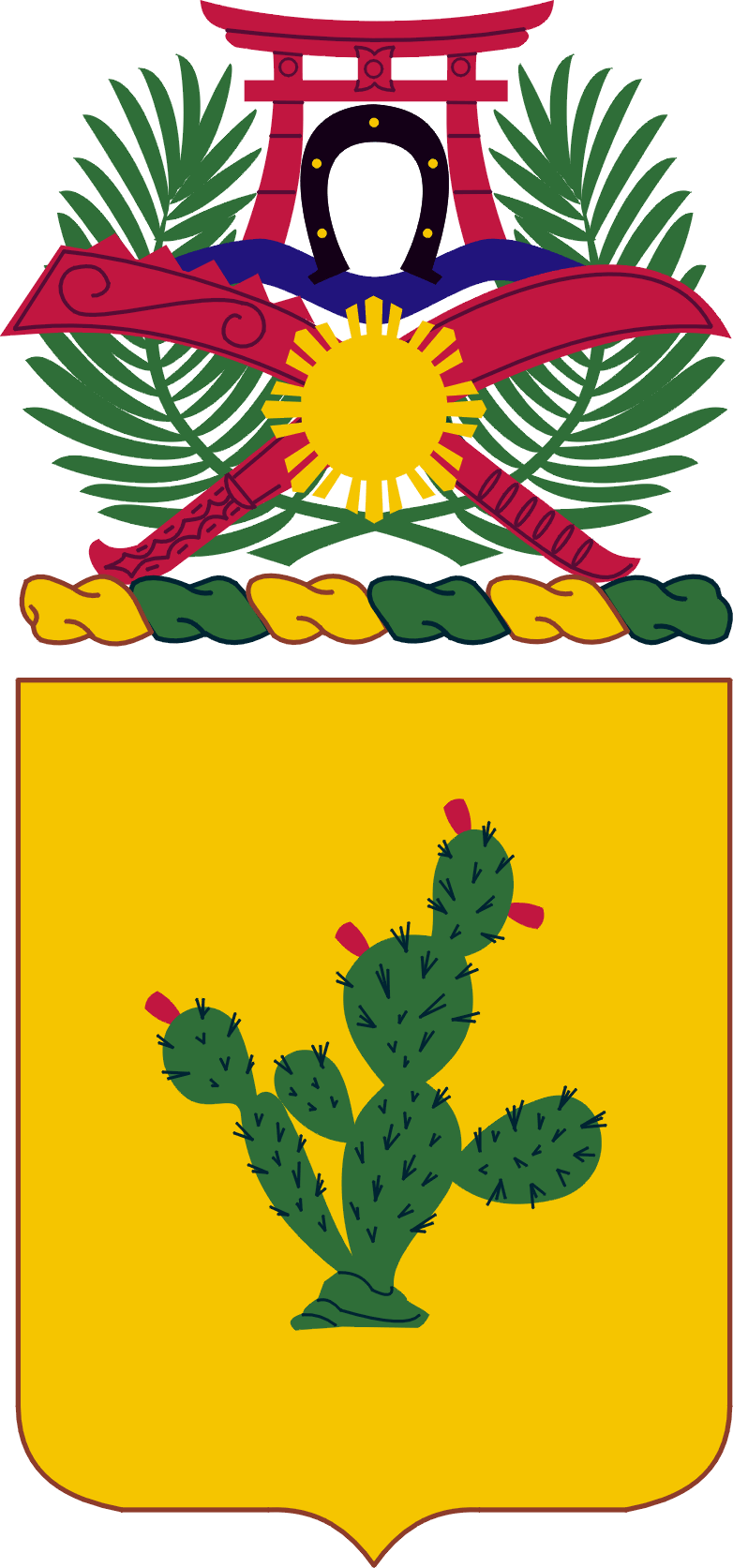
12th Cavalry
"Semper Paratus" (Always Ready)

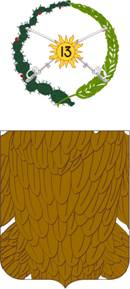
13th Cavalry
(formerly 13th Armor)
(crest only, no shield)
"It Shall Be Done"

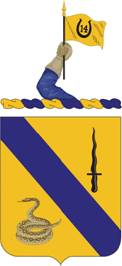
14th Cavalry
"Suivez Moi" (Follow Me)

15th Cavalry
(formerly 15th Armor)
"Tours Pour Un, Un Pour Tous" (One for All, All for One)

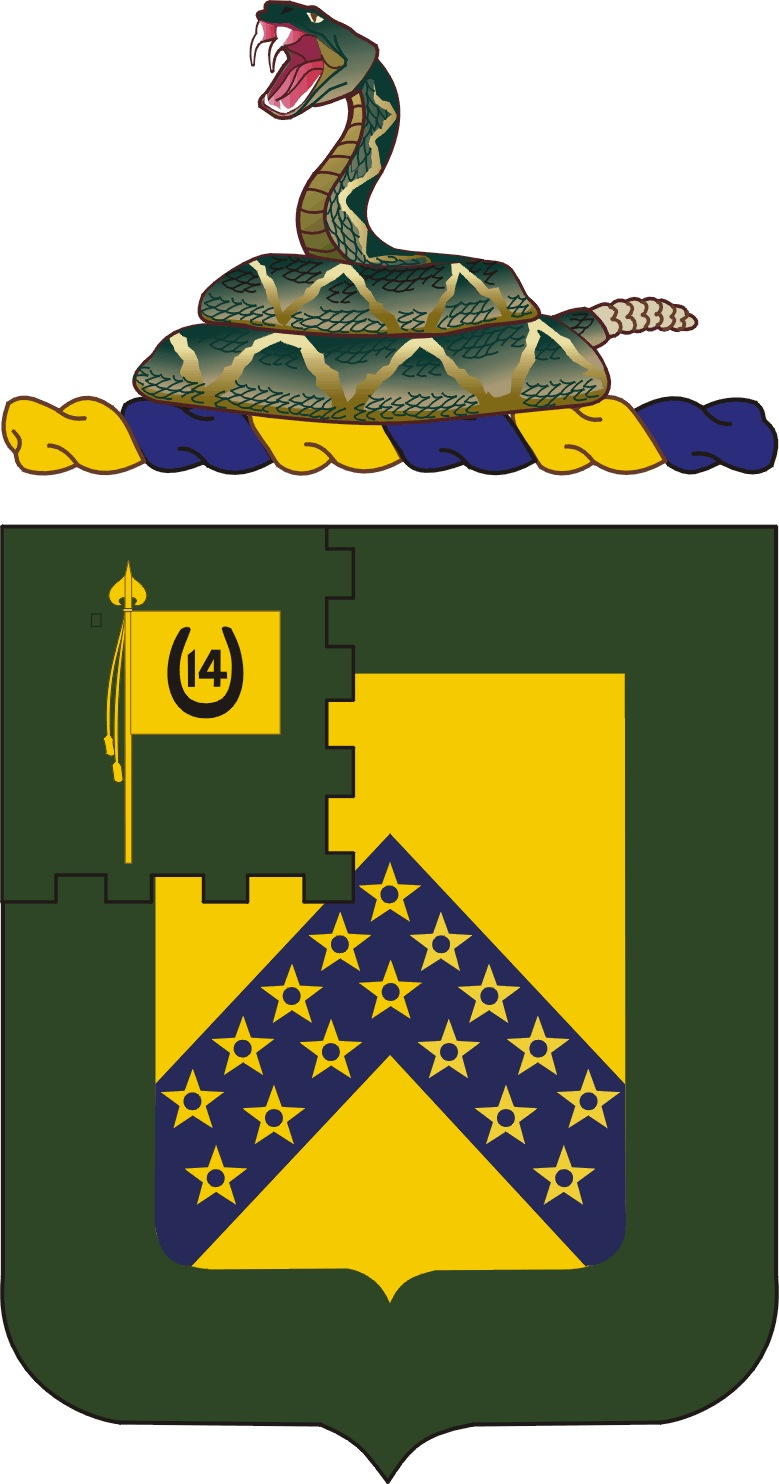
16th Cavalry
(formerly 16th Armor)
"Strike Hard"

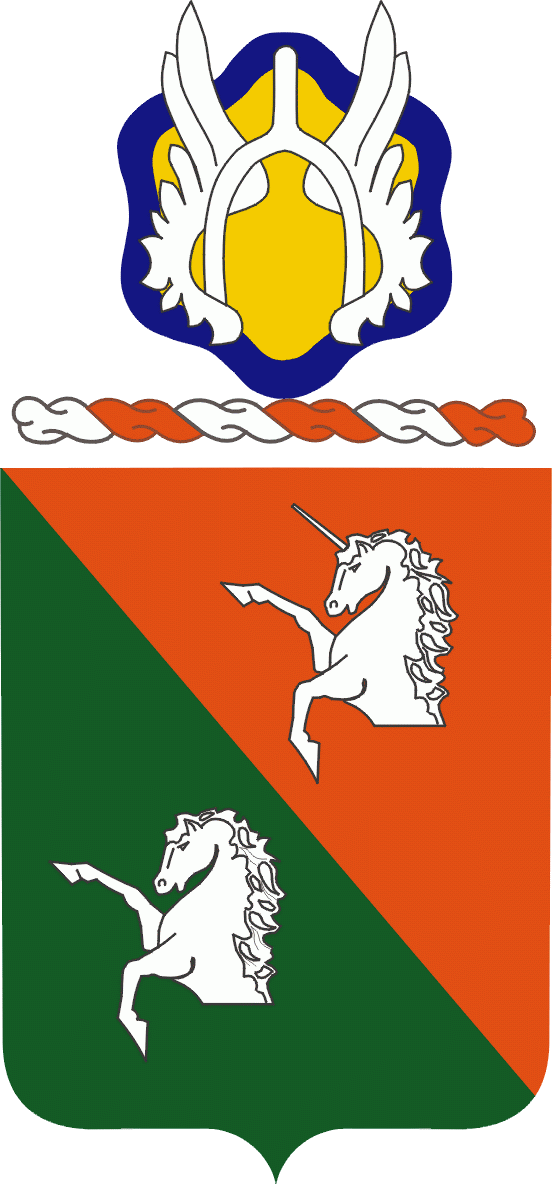
17th Cavalry
"Forward"

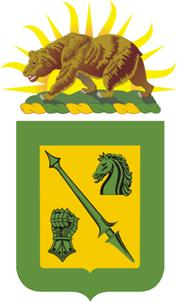
18th Cavalry
"Velox Et Mortifer" (Swift and Deadly)

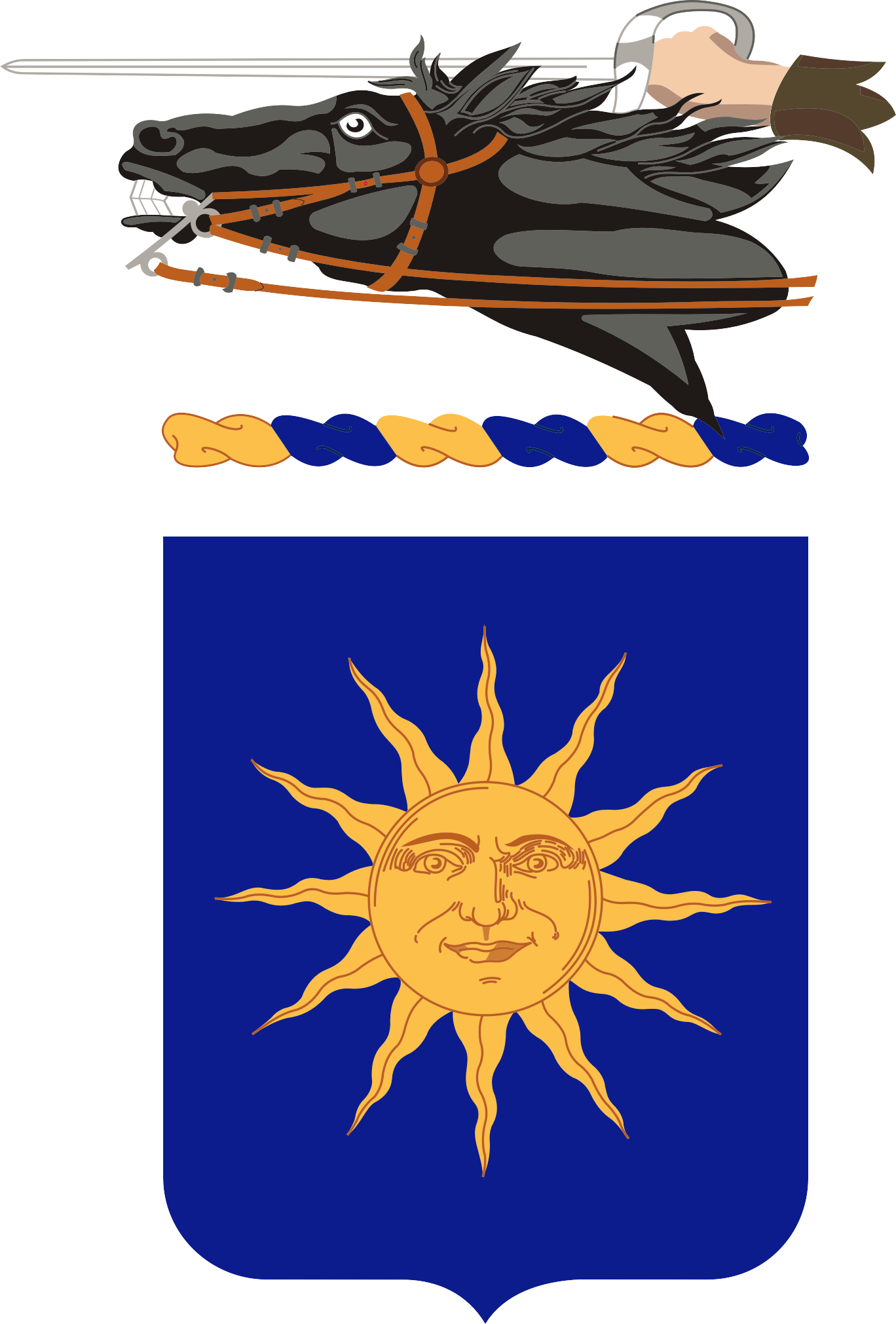
26th Cavalry
"Our strength is in loyalty"

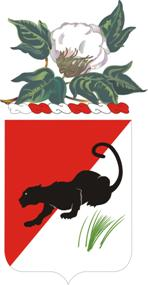
31st Cavalry
"Celer Et Non Visi" (Swift and Unseen)

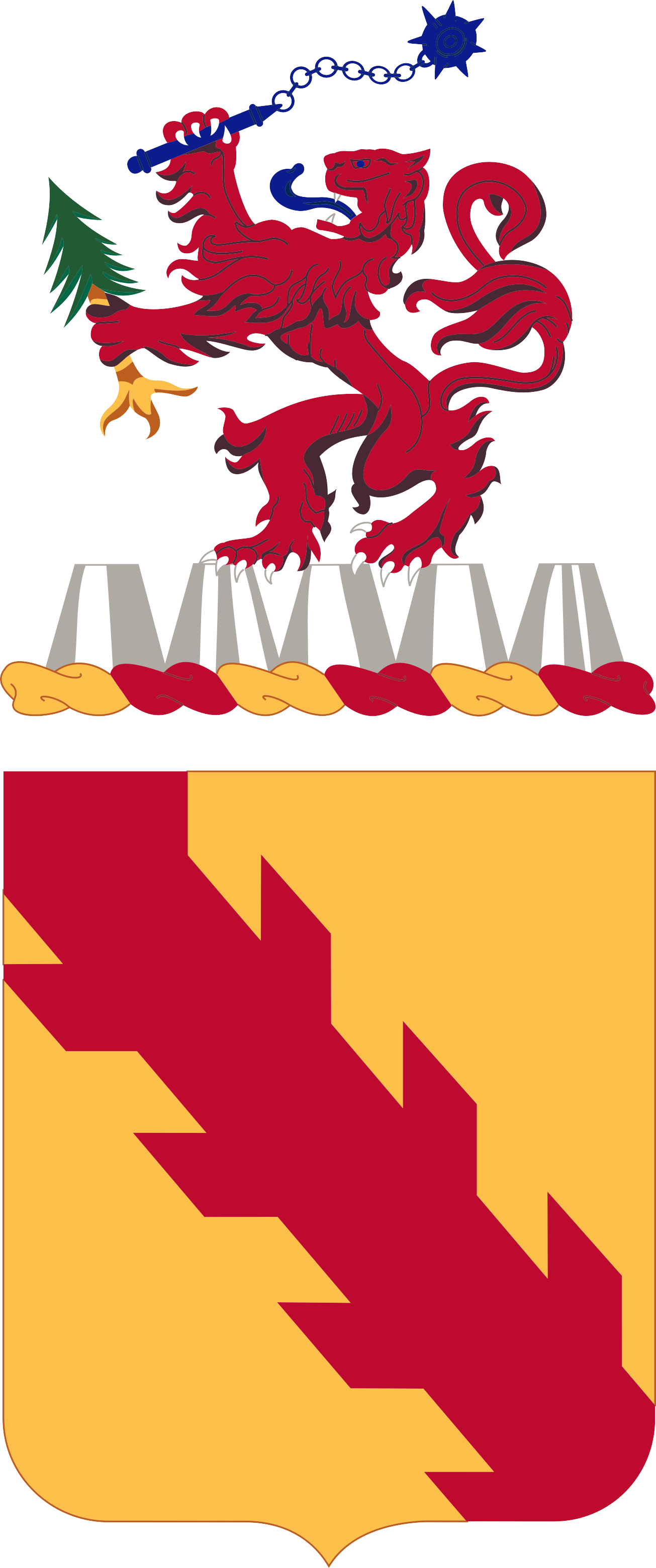
32d Cavalry
"Victory or death"

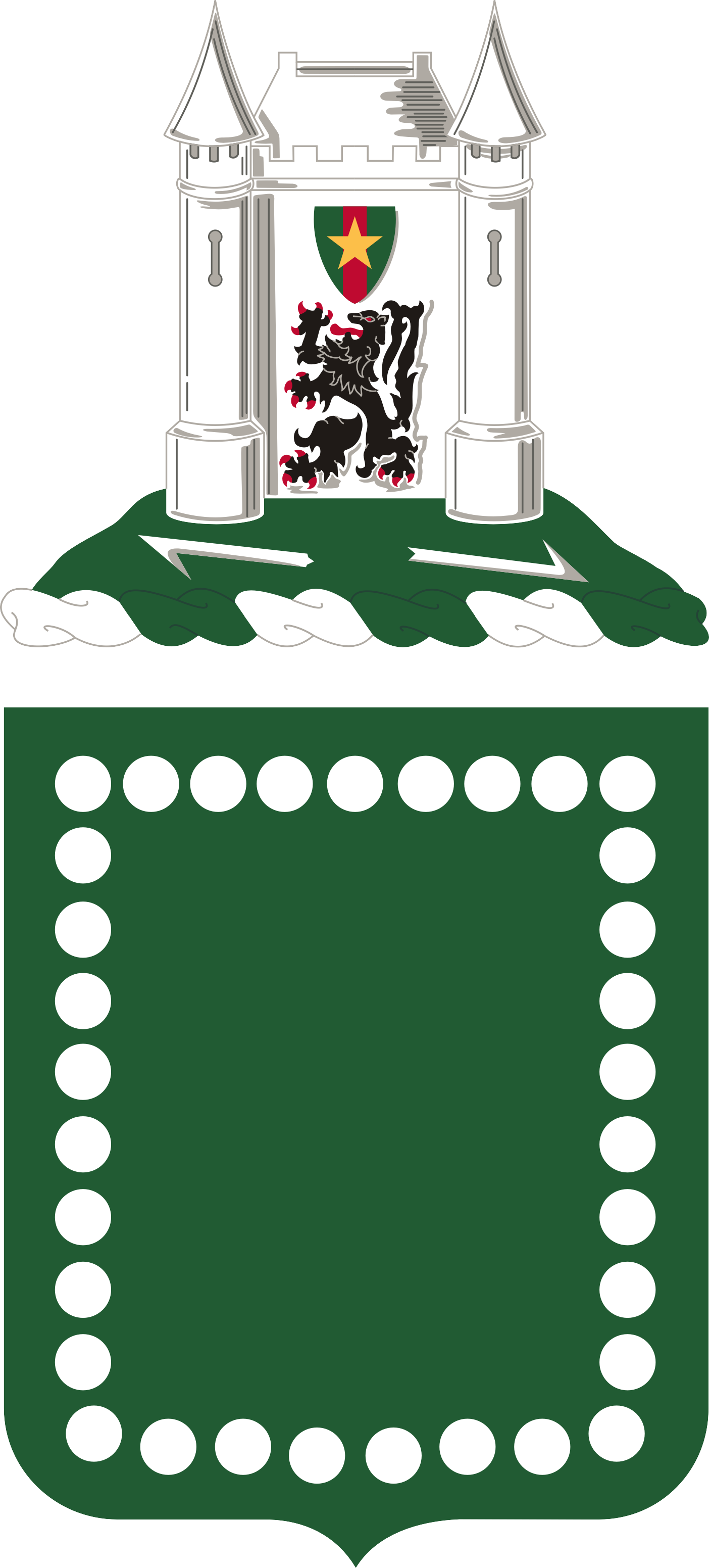
33d Cavalry
"Man of War"
(formerly 33rd Armor)

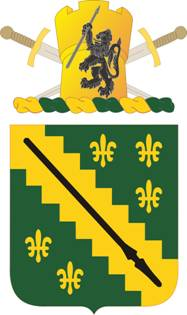
38th Cavalry
"Always in front"

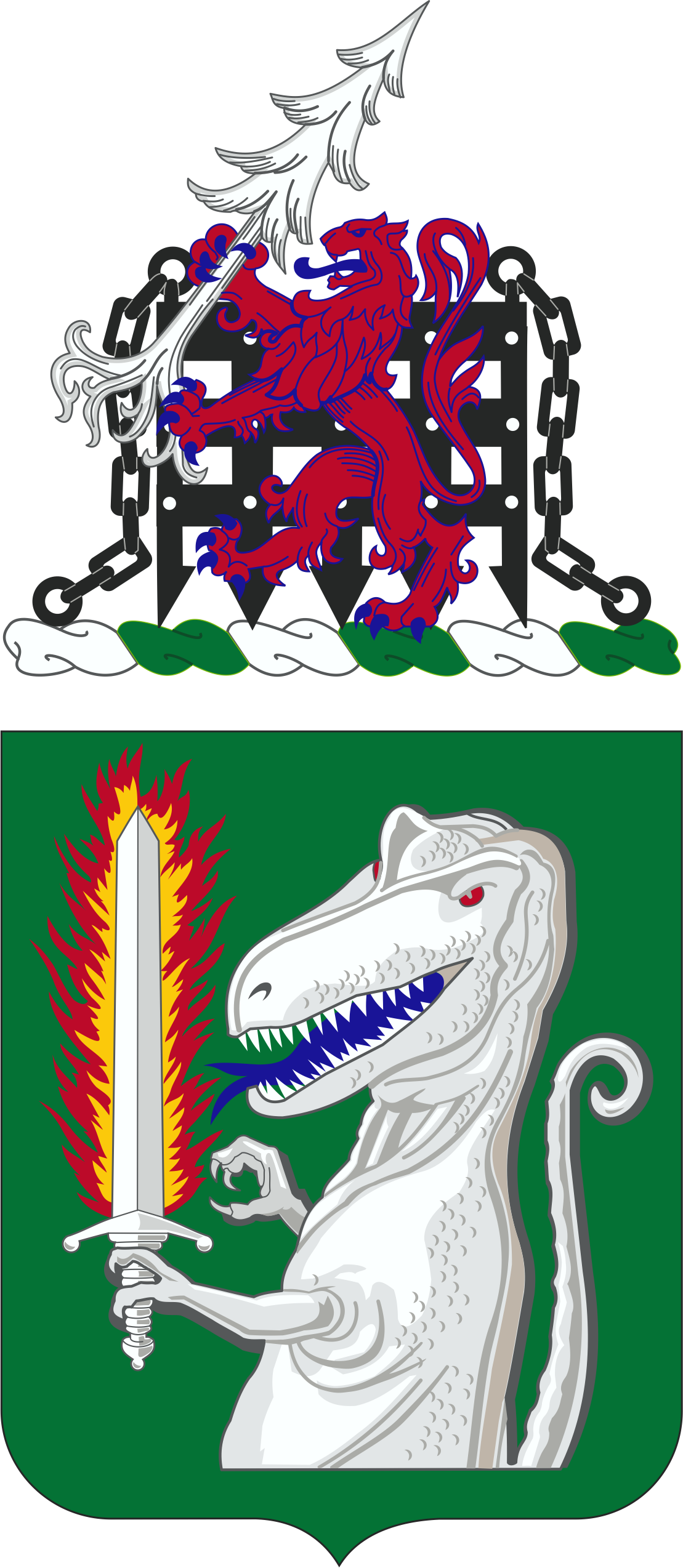
40th Cavalry
(formerly 40th Armor)
"By Force and Valor"

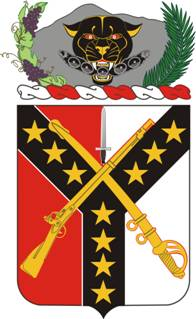
61st Cavalry
"Forging Destiny"

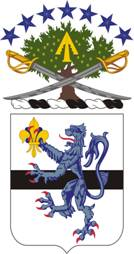
71st Cavalry
"Gallantly Forward"

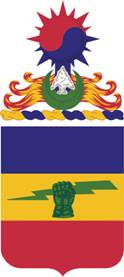
73d Cavalry
(formerly 73rd Armor)
"Honor, Fidelity, Courage"
"Airborne Thunder"

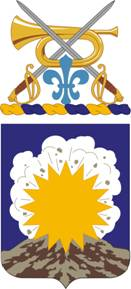
75th Cavalry
"One Round"

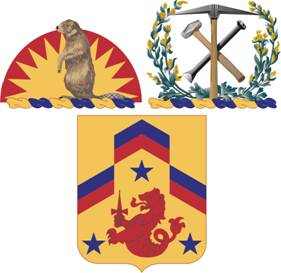
82nd Cavalry
(formerly 82nd Armor)
"Temeritas" (Temerity)

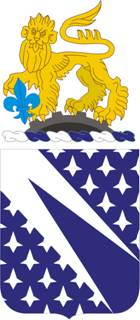
89th Cavalry
"Ready Now"

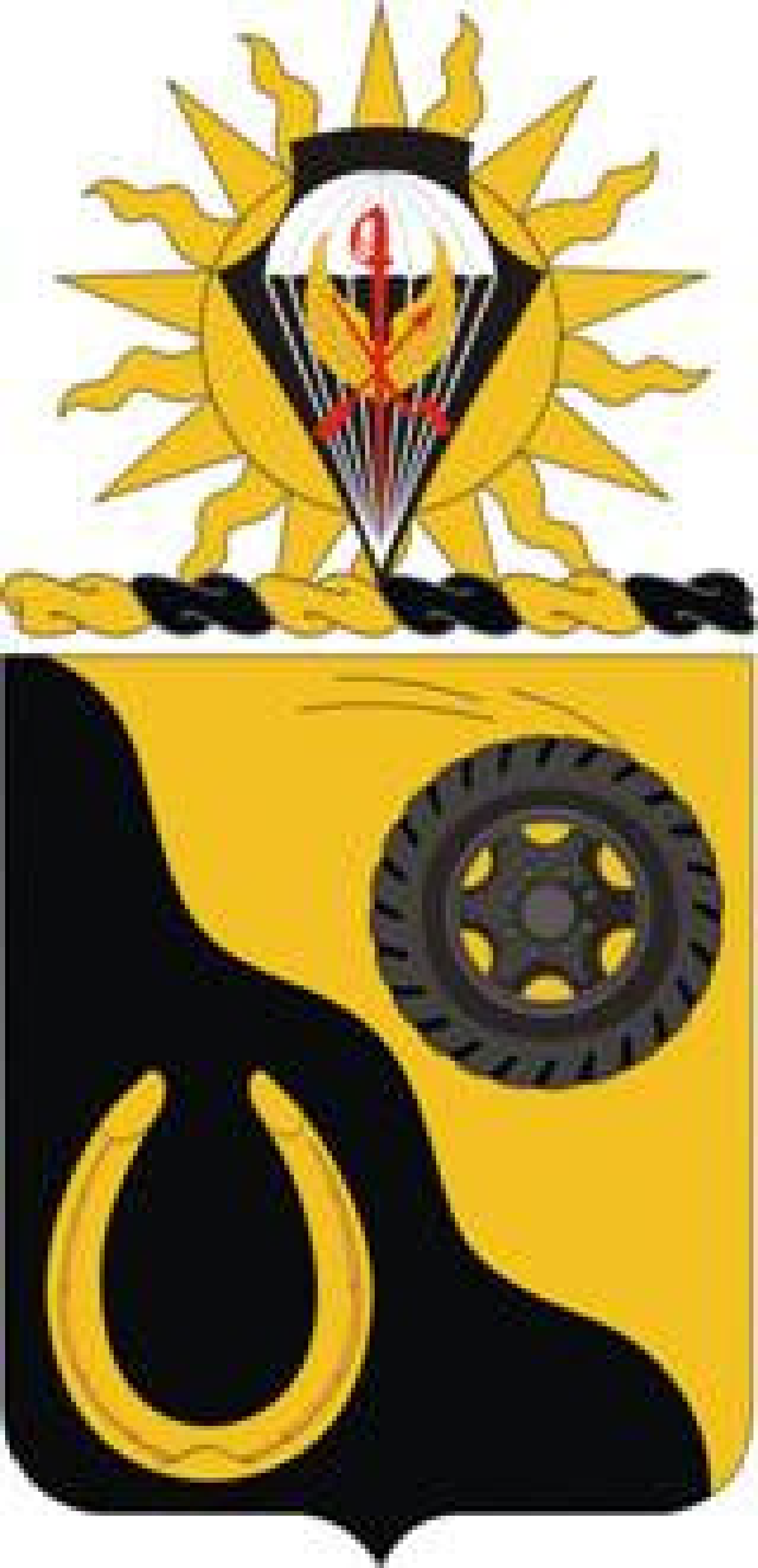
91st Cavalry
"Alert"

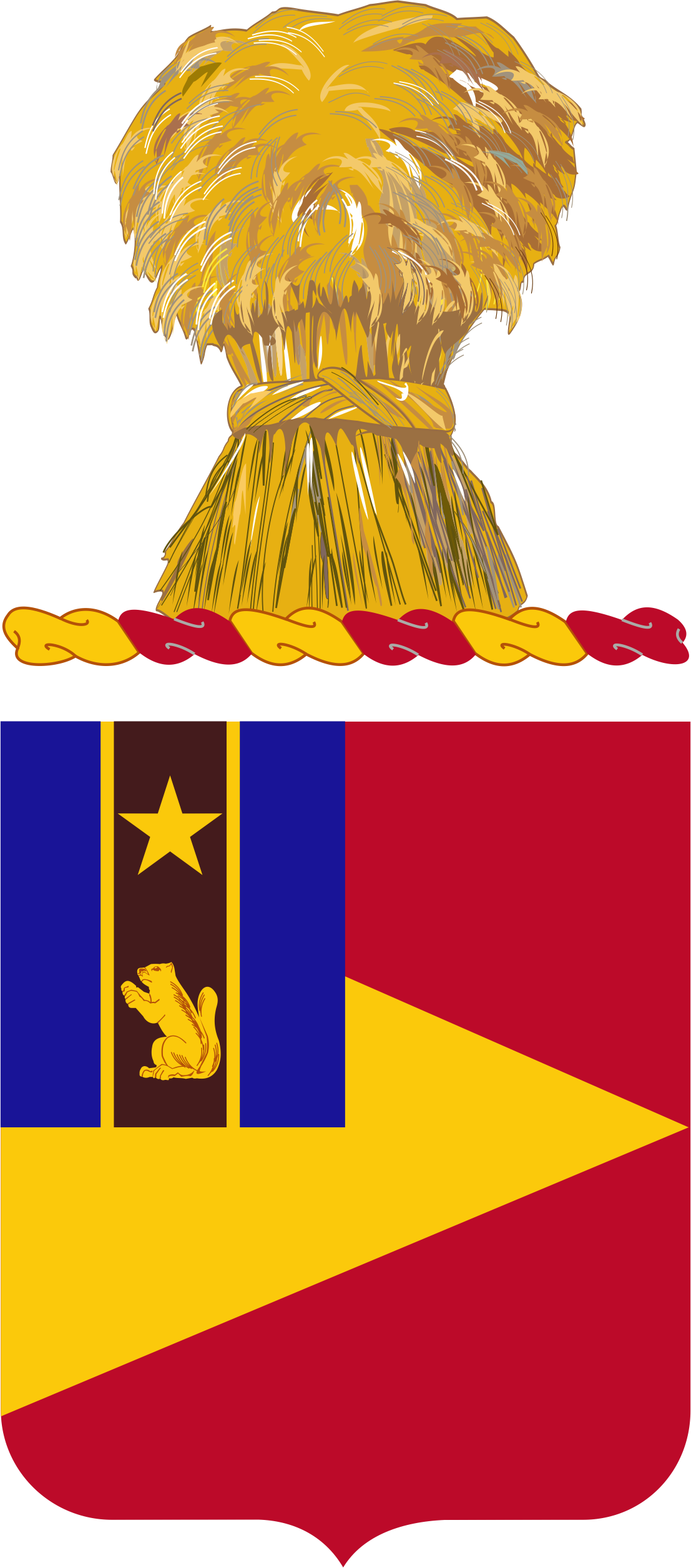
94th Cavalry
(formerly 215th Coast Artillery & 94th Armor)
"Viking Vanguard"

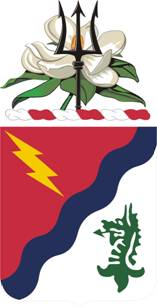
98th Cavalry
"Meridianus Adamantinus" (Southern Steel)

=== 101 to 300 ===
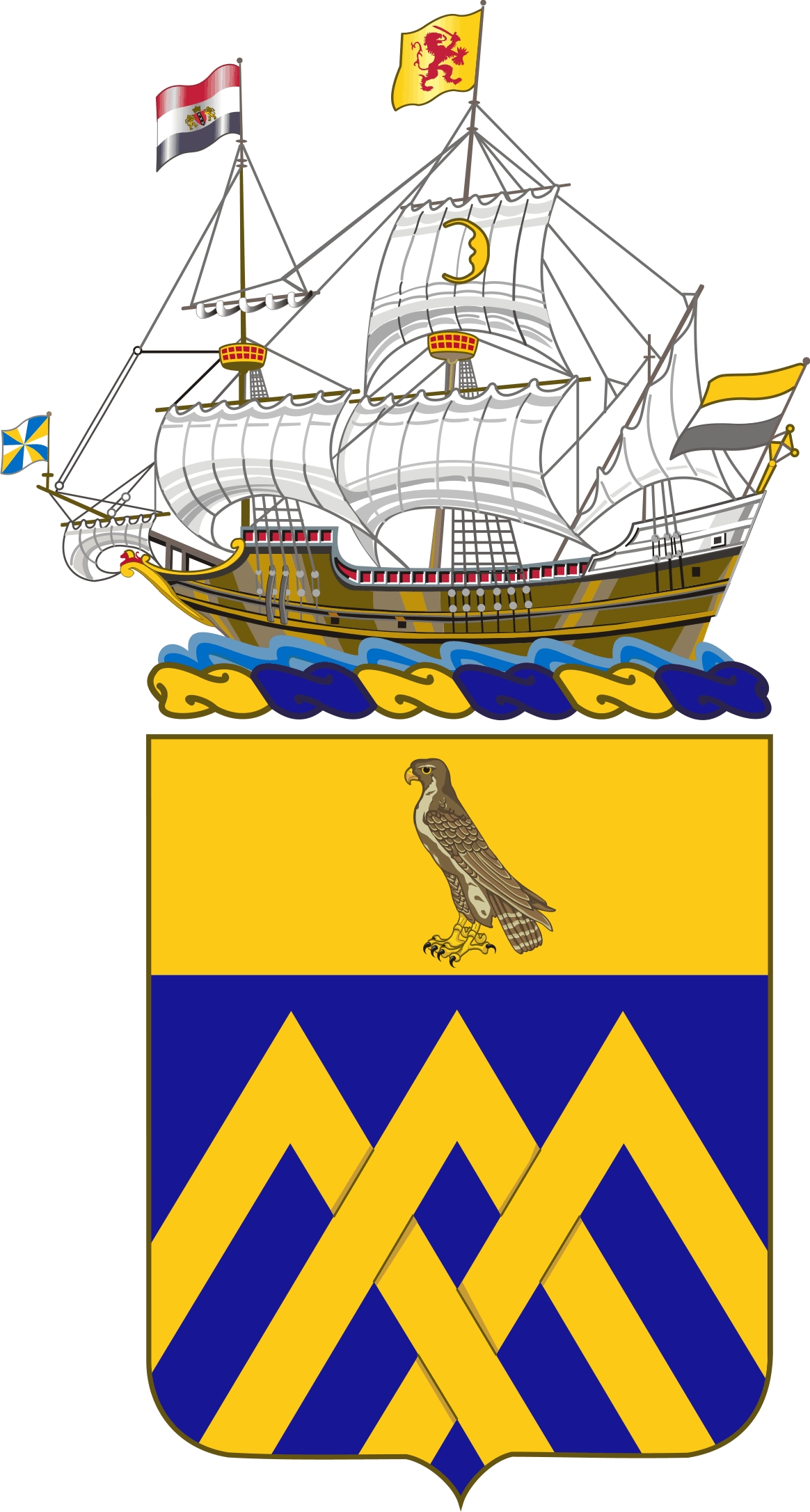
101st Cavalry
"To the Upmost"

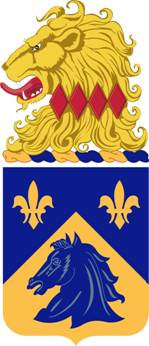
102d Cavalry
(formerly 117th Cavalry)
"Show 'Em the Way"

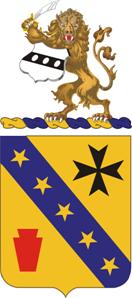
104th Cavalry
"Over, Under or Through"

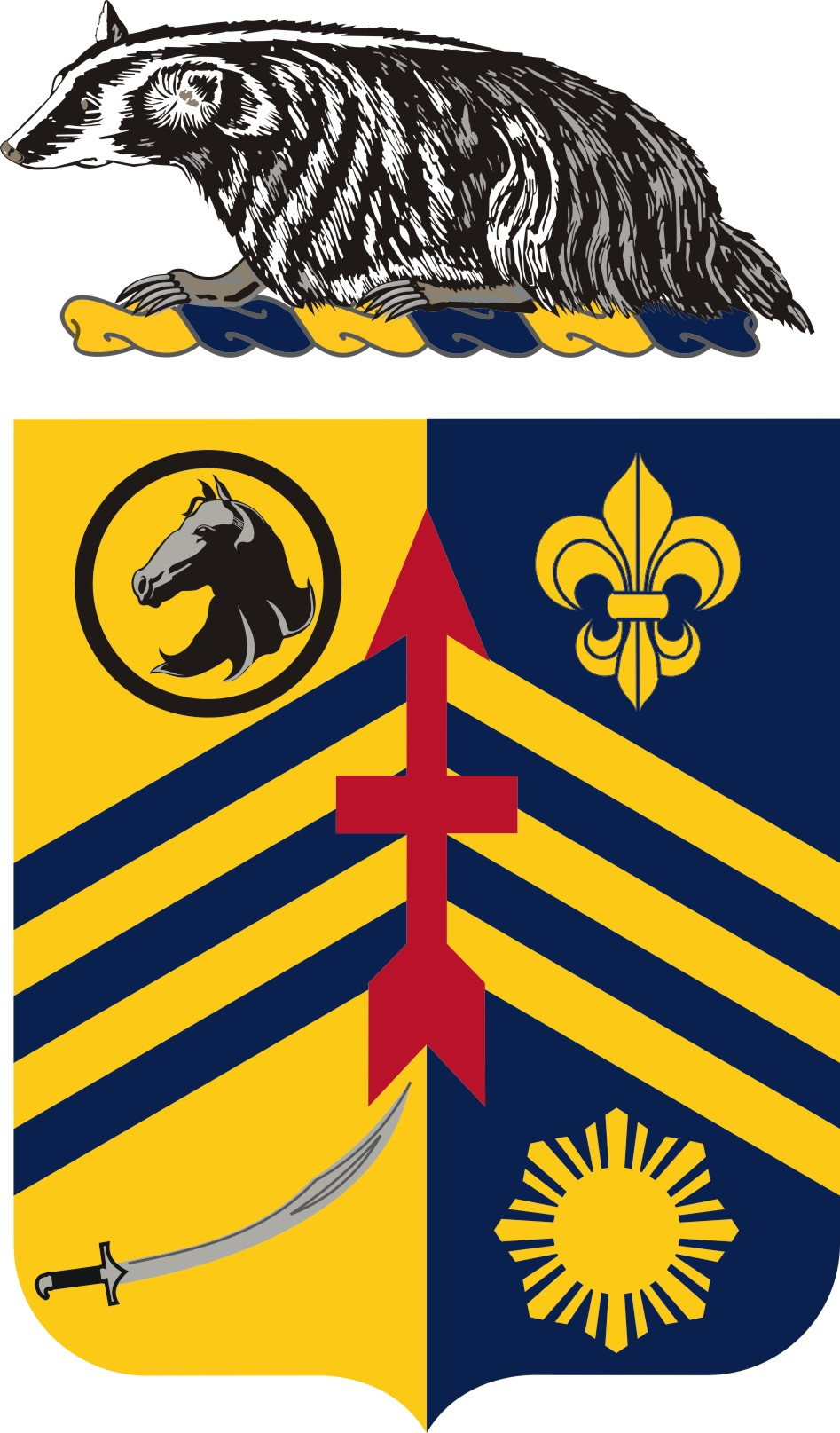
105th Cavalry
"Semper Porro" (Ever Forward or Always Forward)

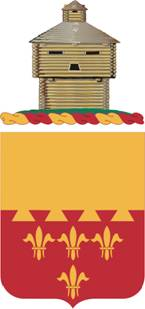
106th Cavalry
(formerly 106th Armor)
"Utcumque Ubique" (Anywhere at Any Time)

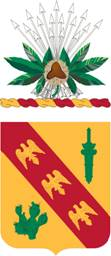
107th Cavalry
"Facere Non Dicere" (To Act, Not To Speak)

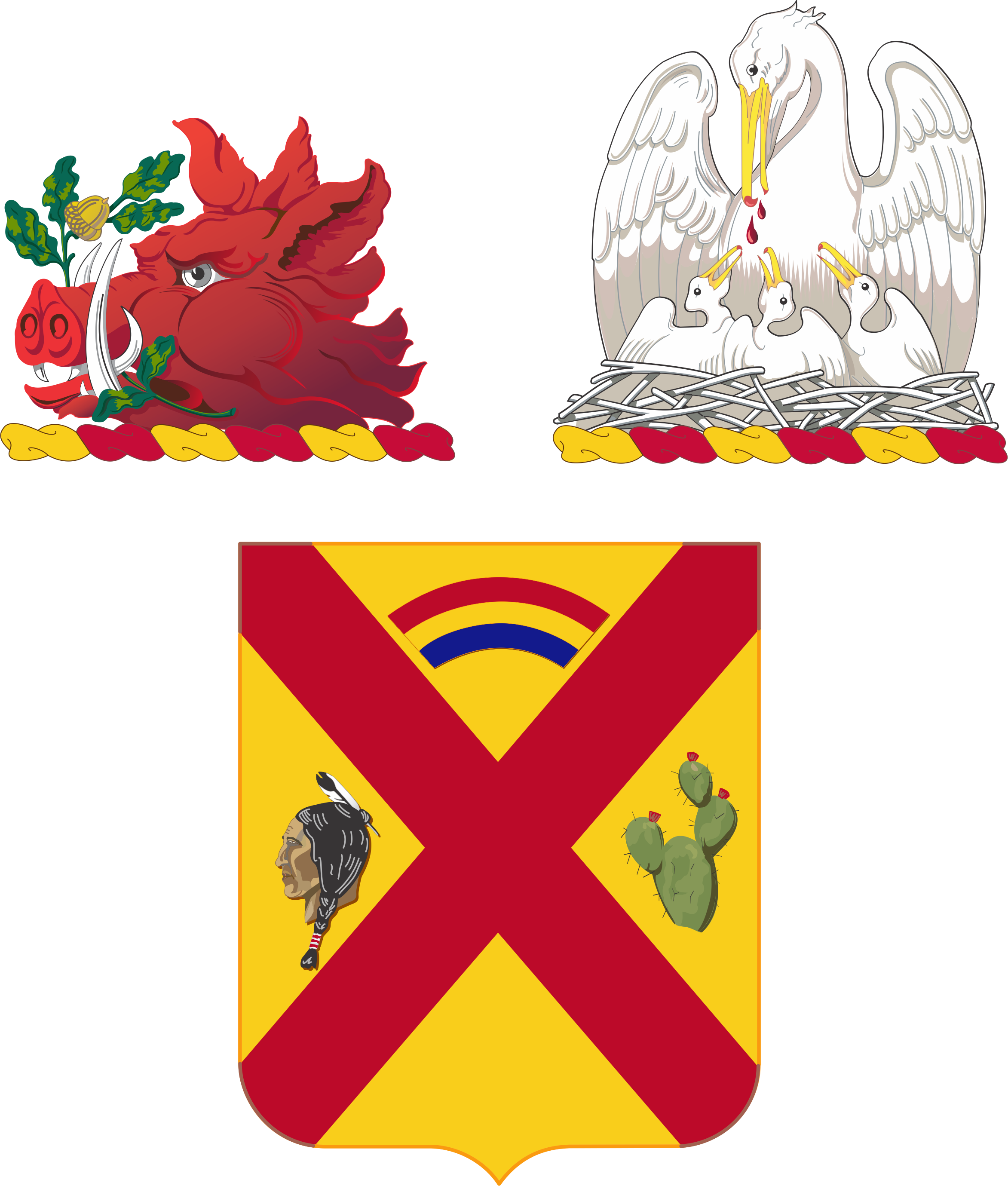
108th Cavalry
"Come what will"

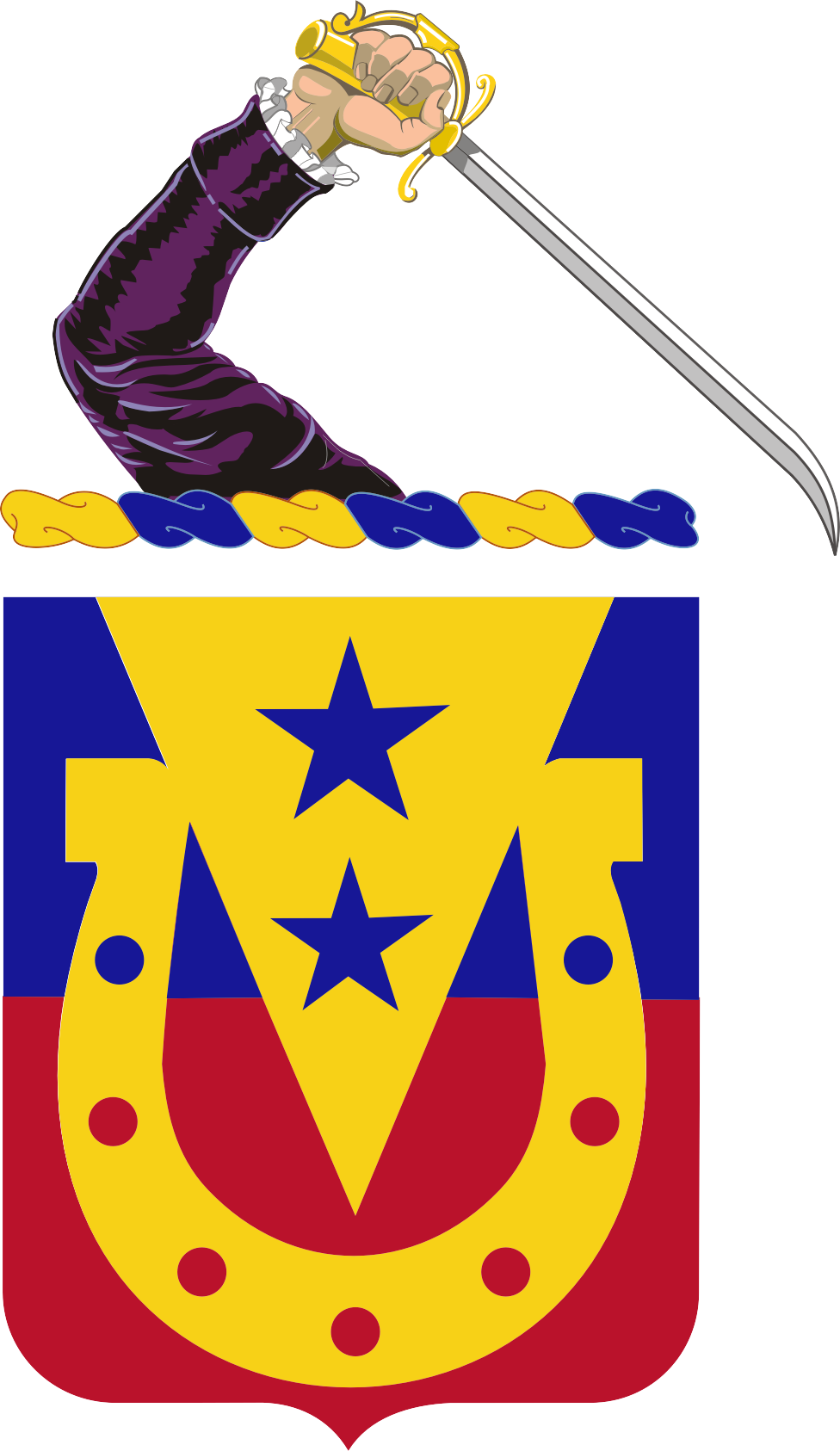
110th Cavalry
"Yankee eyes"

112th Cavalry
(formerly 112th Armored Cavalry & 112th Armor)
"Rarin' to Go"

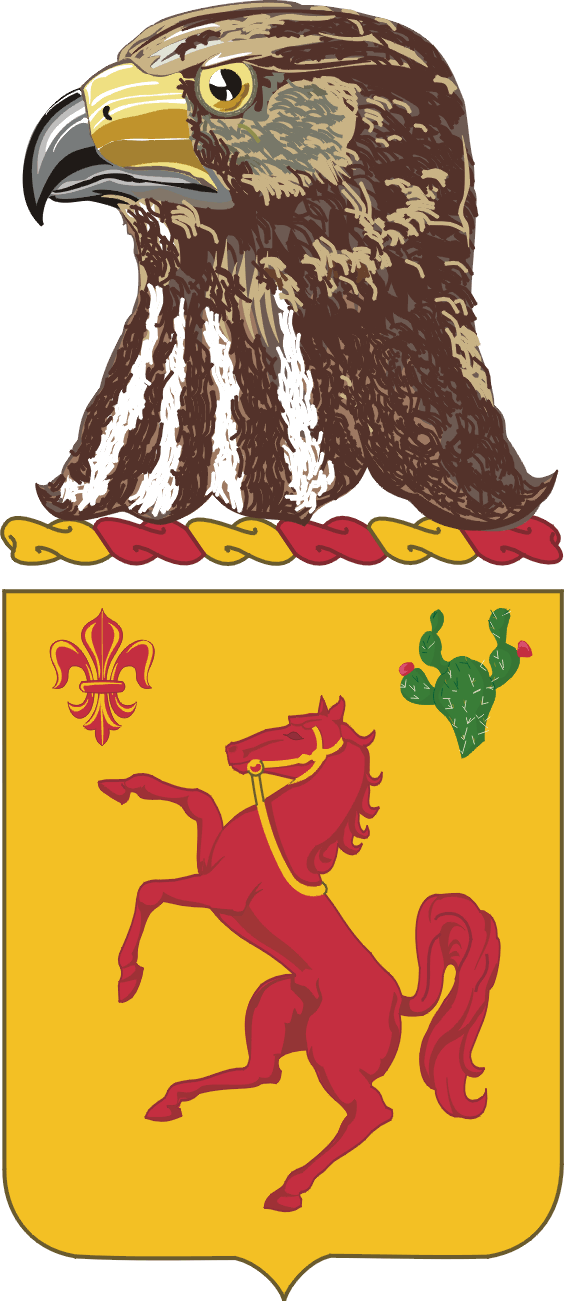
113th Cavalry
(formerly 113th Armor)
"We Maintain"

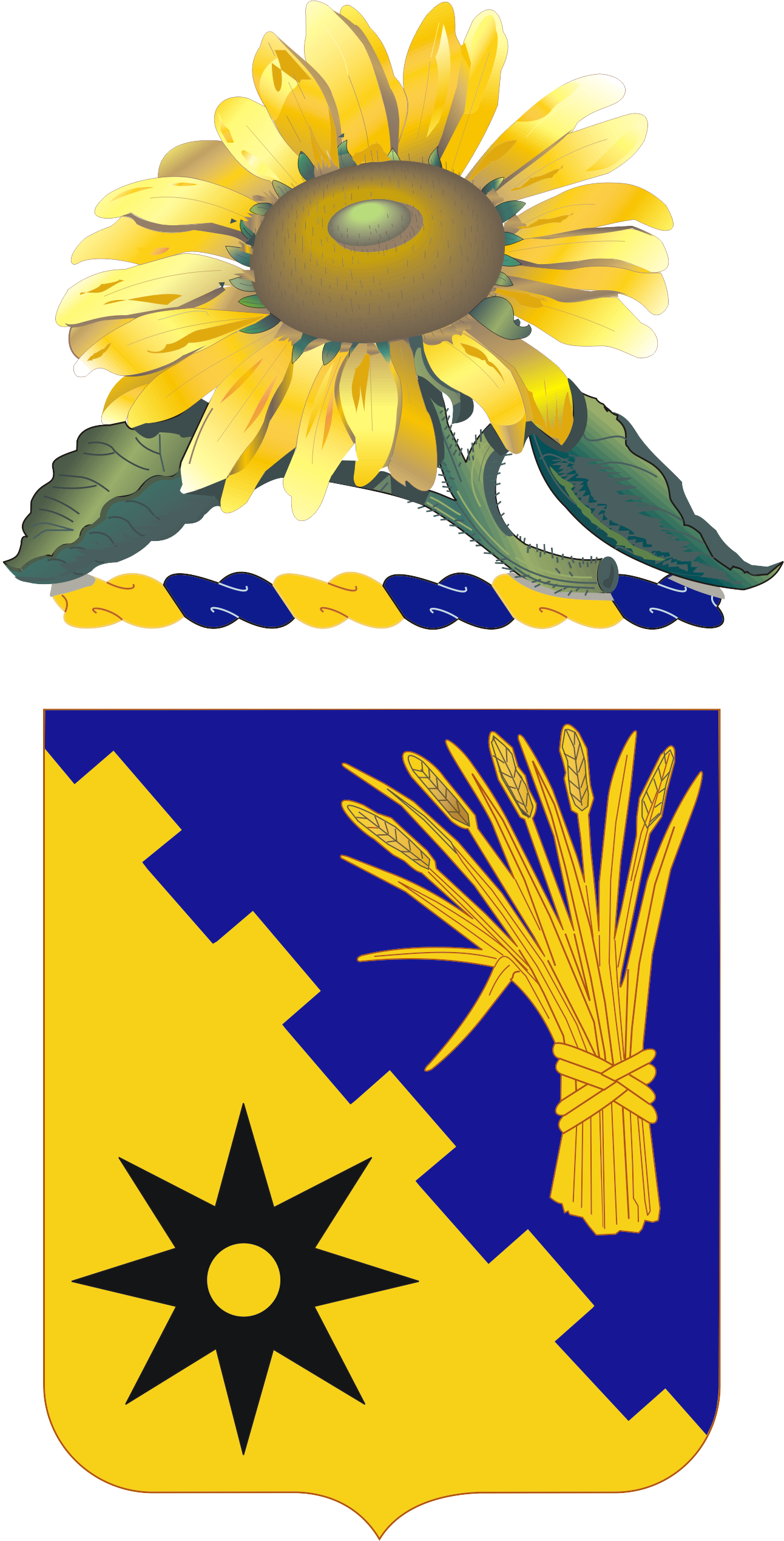
114th Cavalry

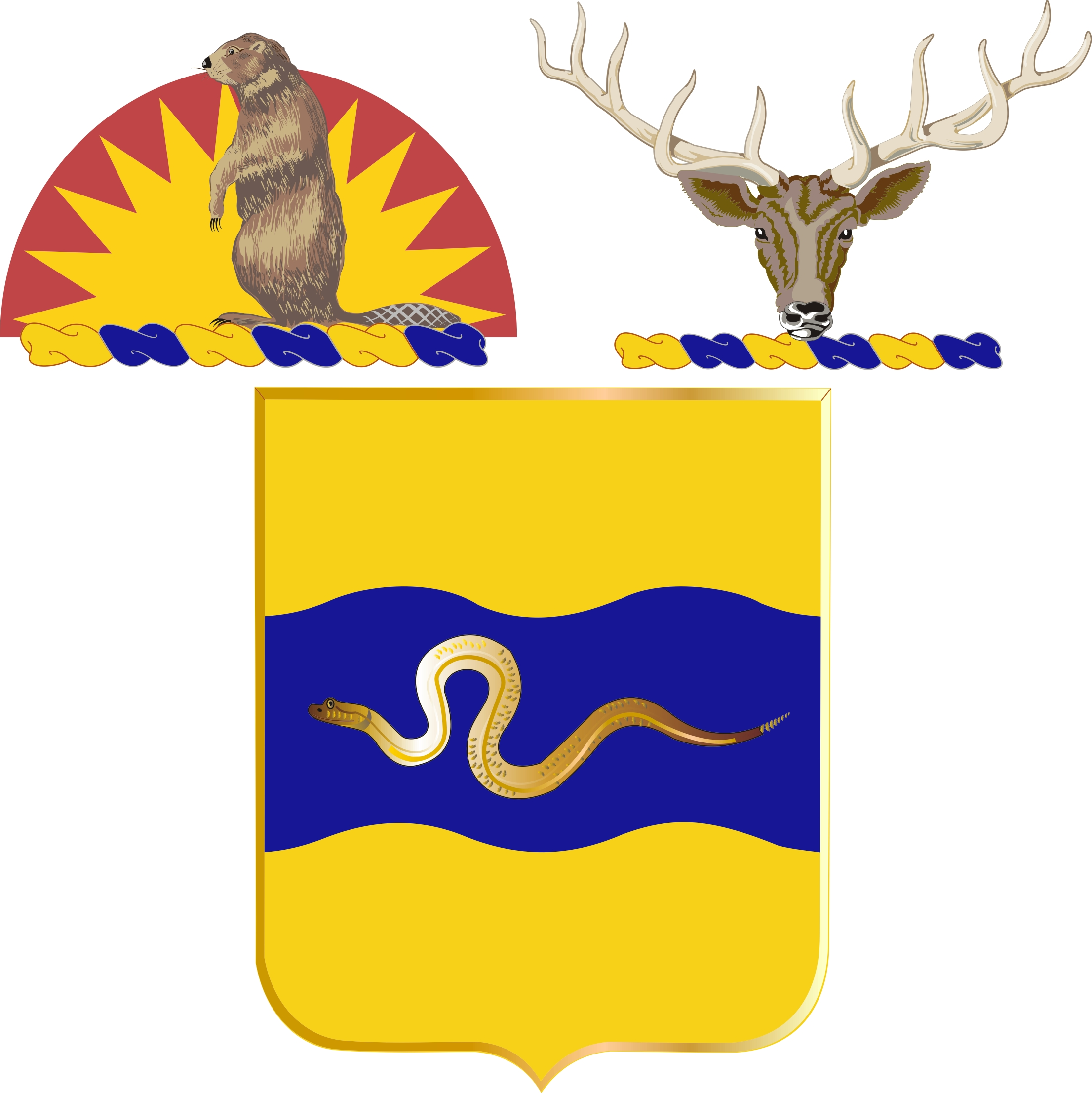
116th Cavalry
(formerly 183rd Field Artillery)
"Sine Mora" (Without Delay)

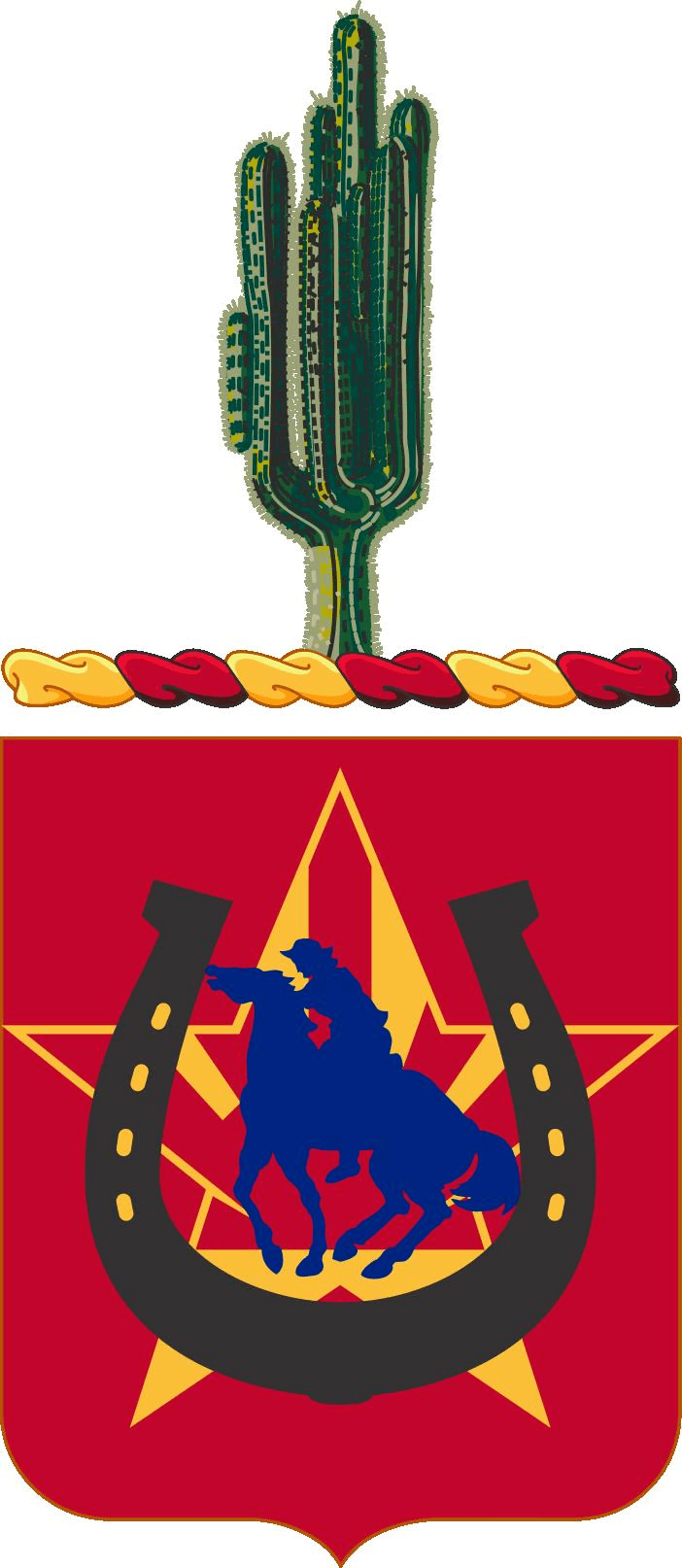
118th Cavalry
"Rough Riders"

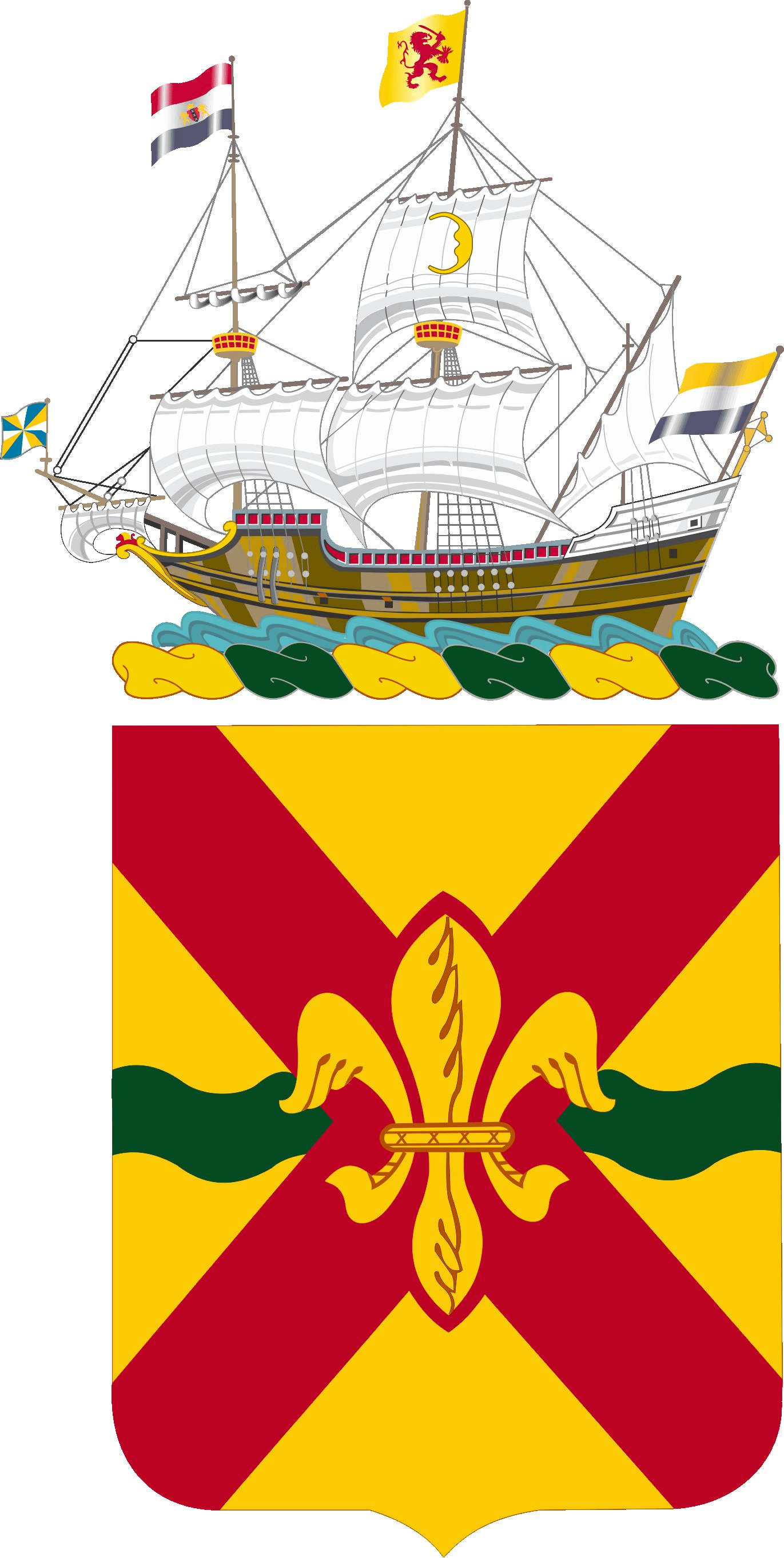
121st Cavalry
(formerly 27th Reconnaissance Bn, then 121st Armor Regiment)
"Vigilantia et Vis" (Vigilance and Strength)

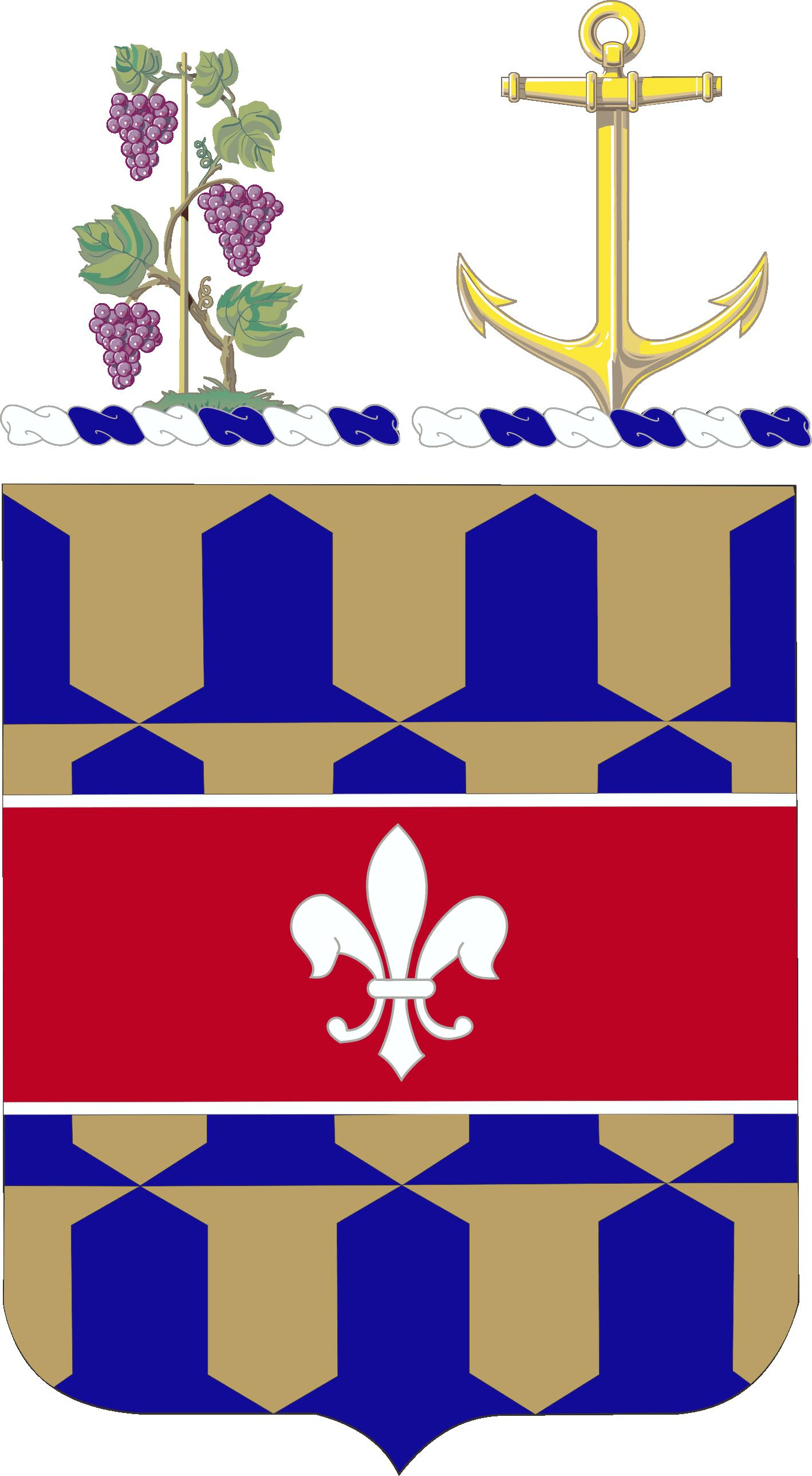
122nd Cavalry – rescinded 11 March 1977
(formerly 1st Connecticut Cavalry Regiment)
"Forward without Fear"

124th Cavalry
"Golpeo Rapidamente" (I Strike Quickly)

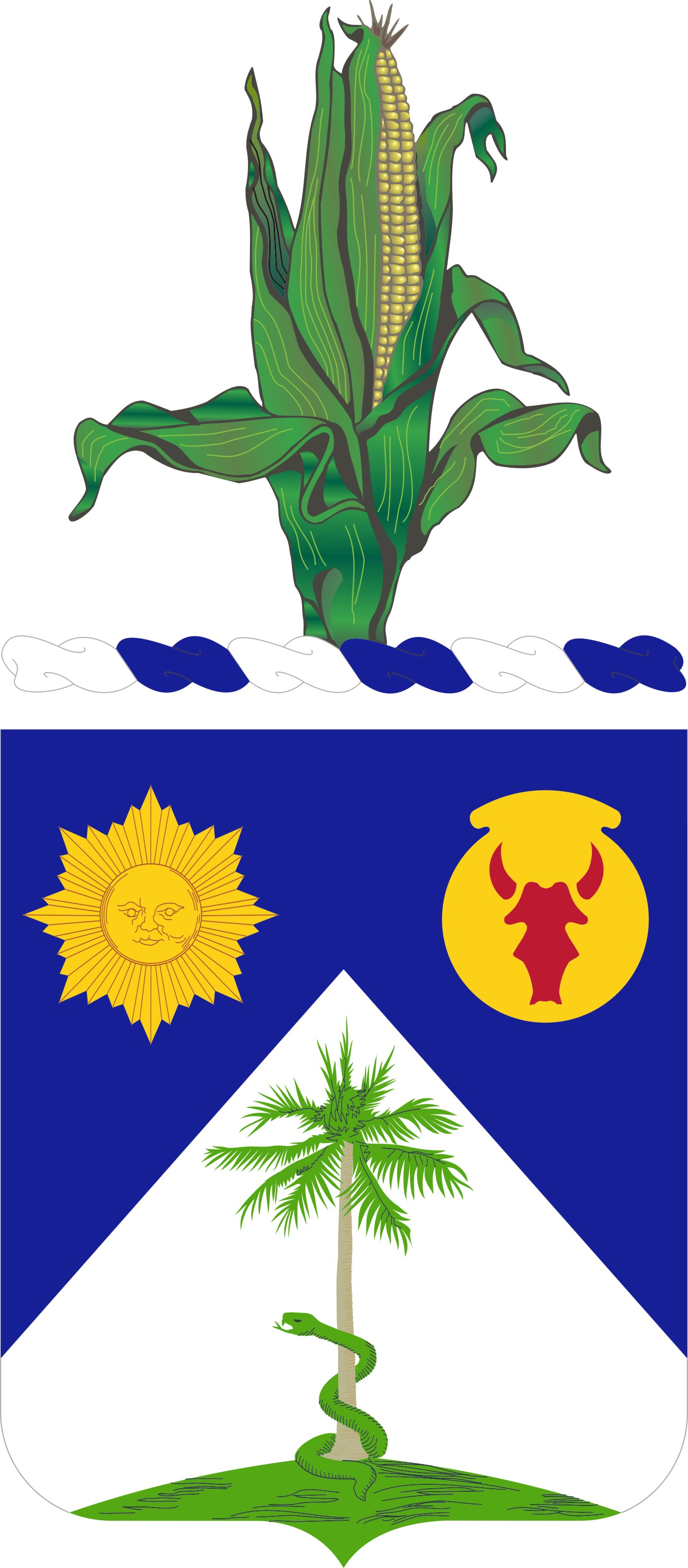
134th Cavalry
(formerly 134th Infantry)
"Lah we Lah his" (The strong The brave)

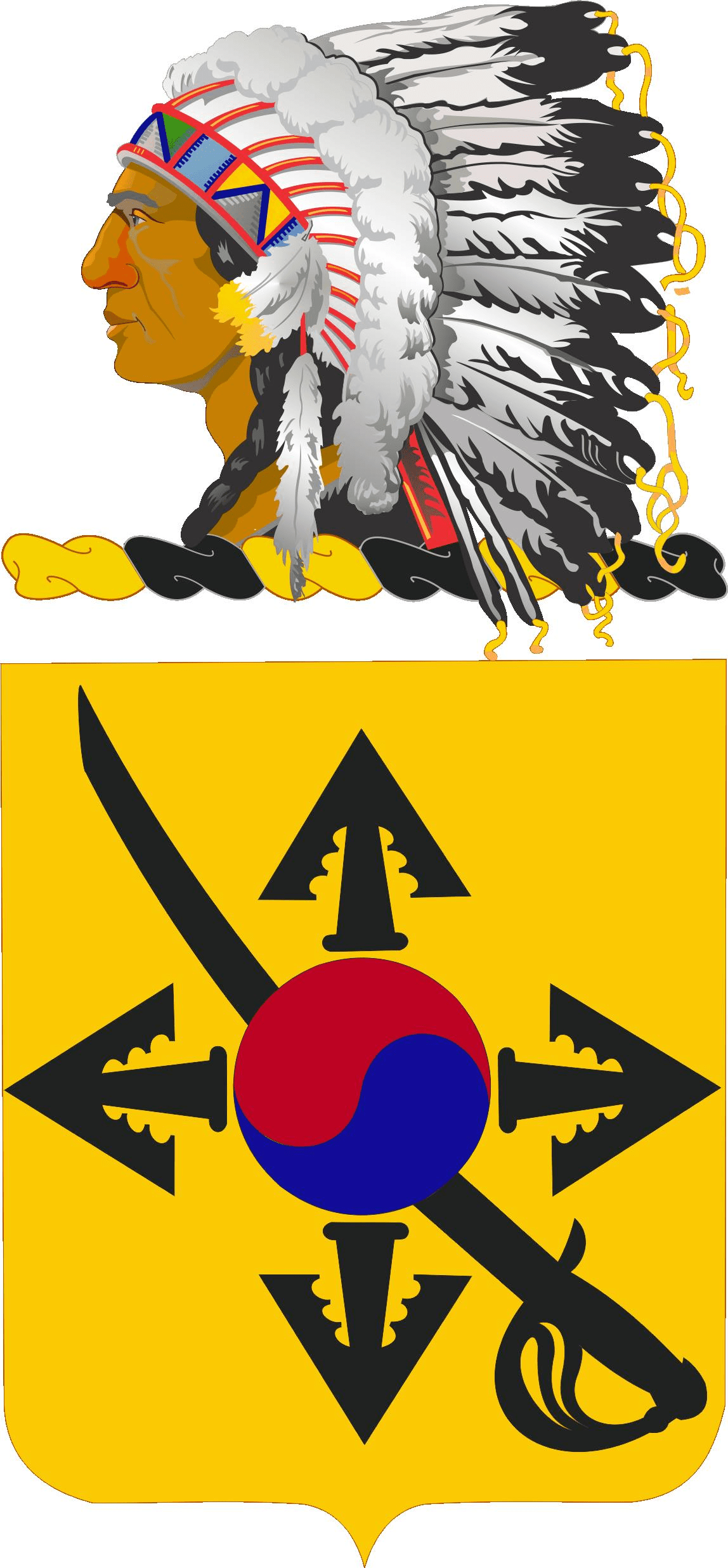
145th Cavalry
"Keen Saber"

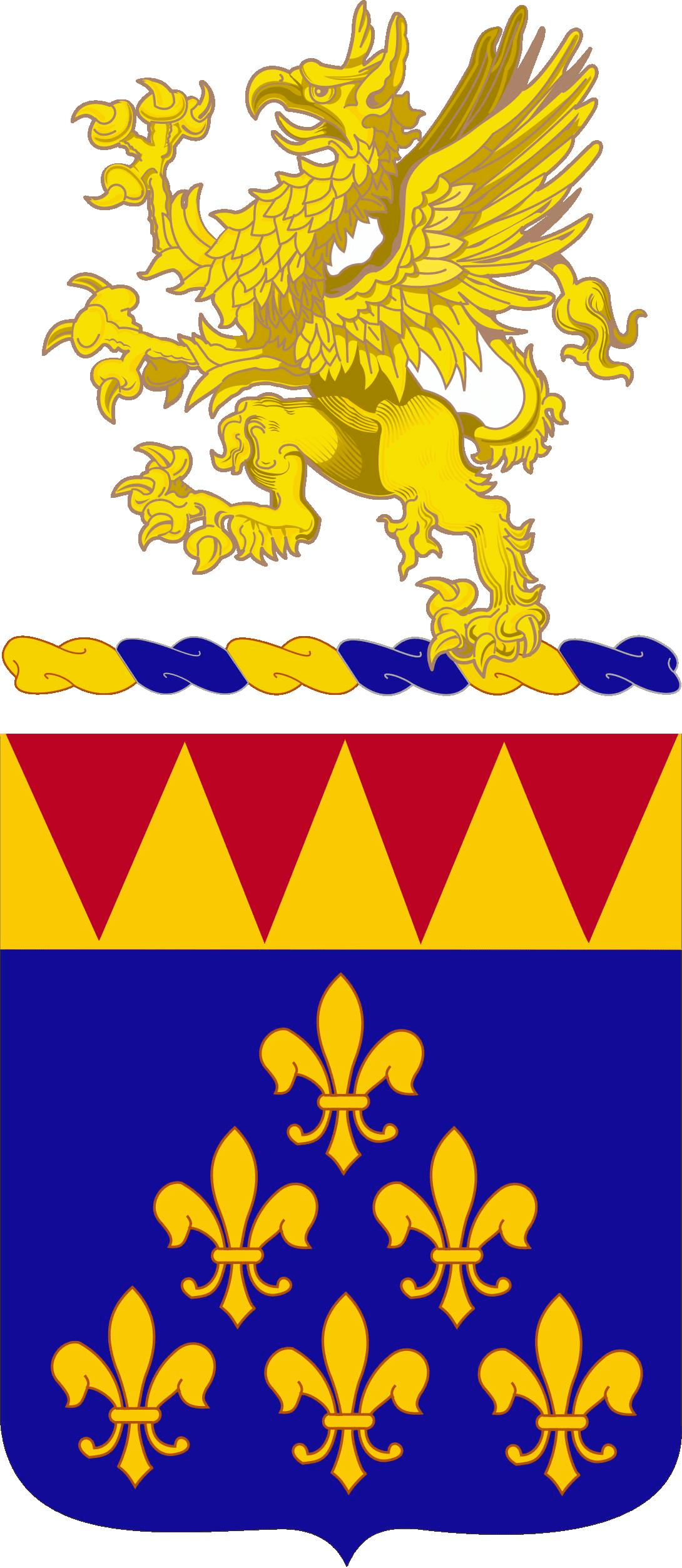
146th Cavalry
"Mounted and Ready"

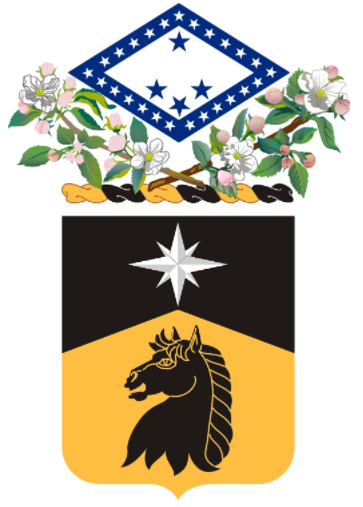
151st Cavalry
"Lead the Way"

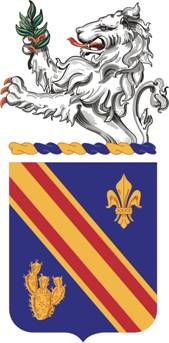
152nd Cavalry
(formerly 152d Infantry with different blazon))
"Fit To Fight"

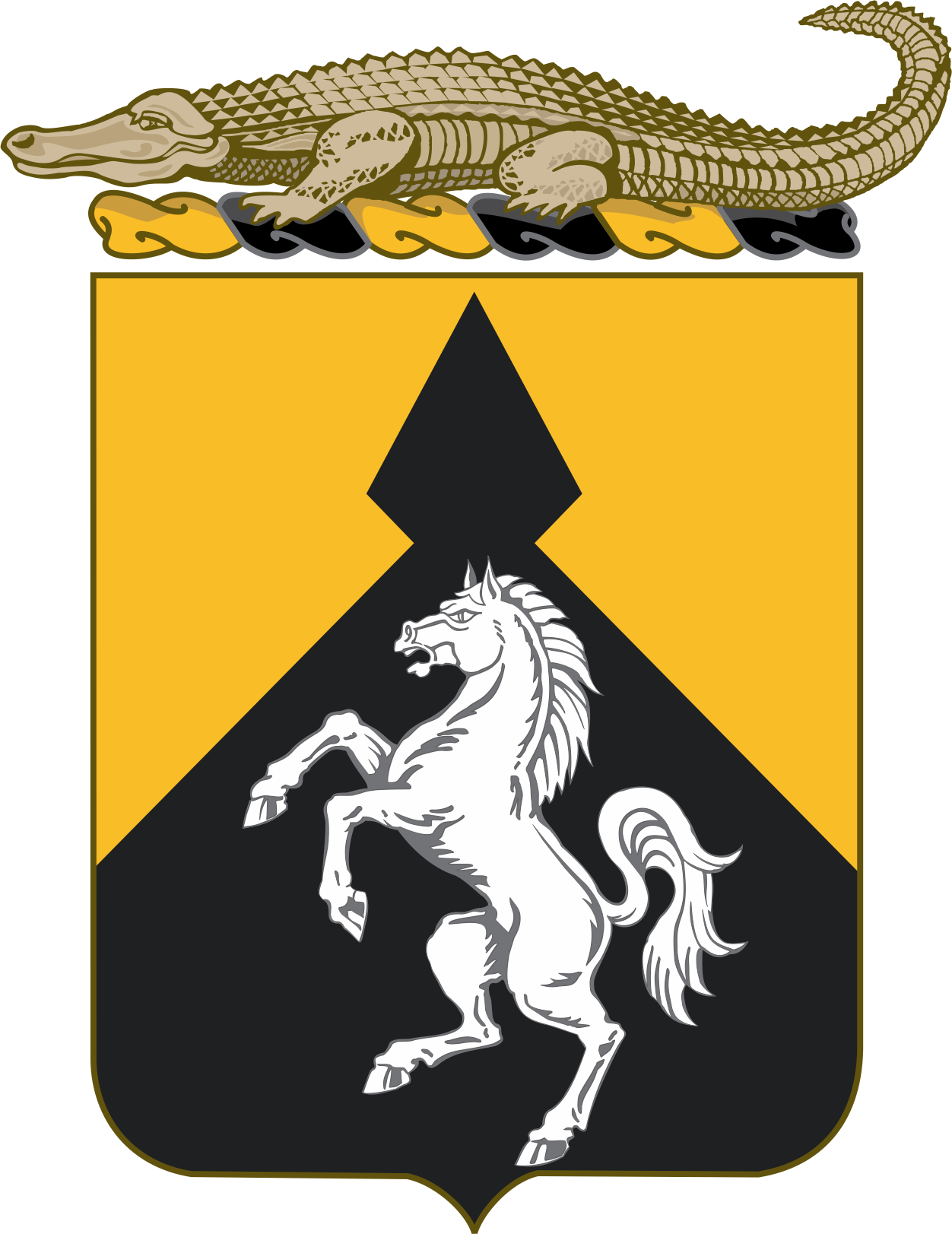
153d Cavalry
"Scouts out"

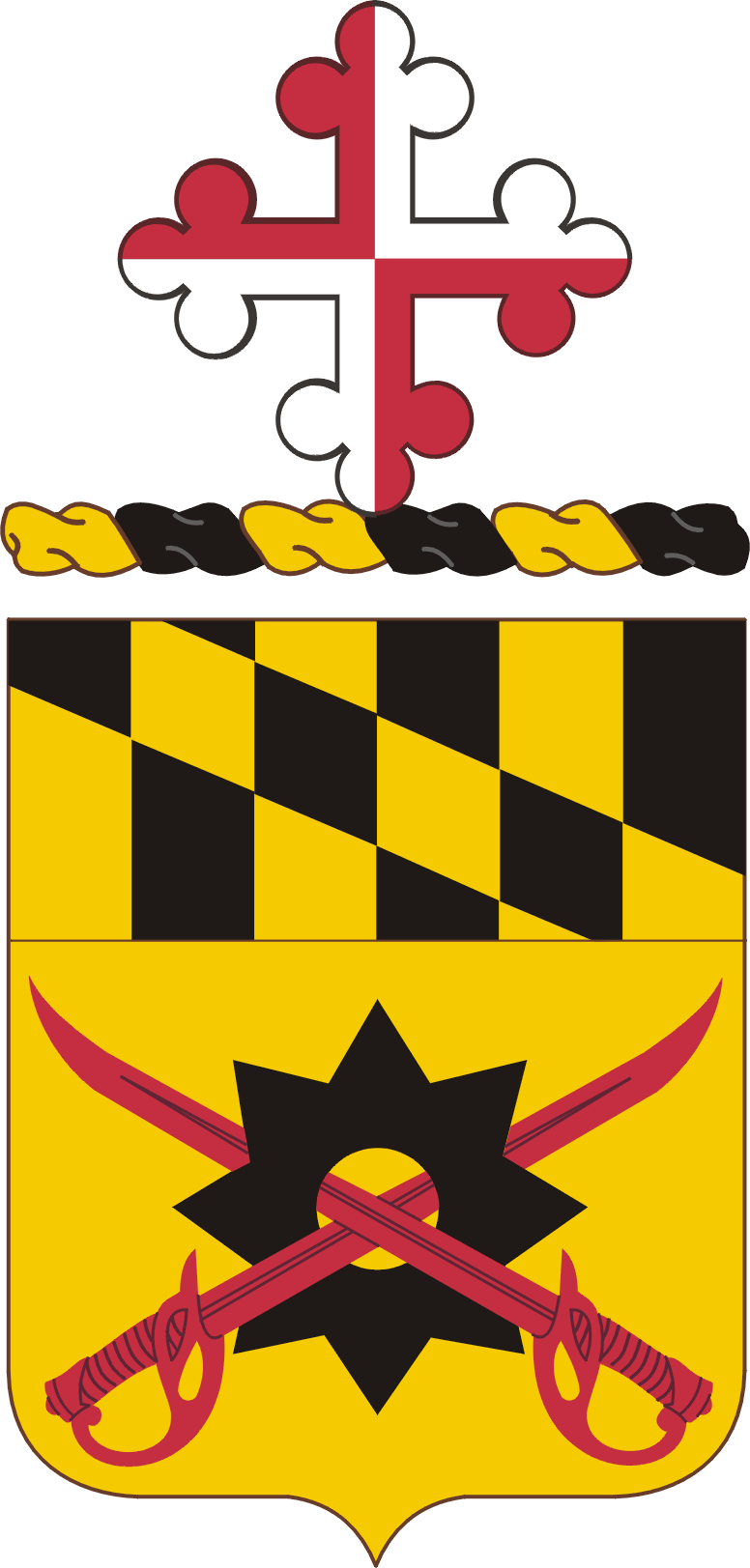
158th Cavalry
"First To the Front"

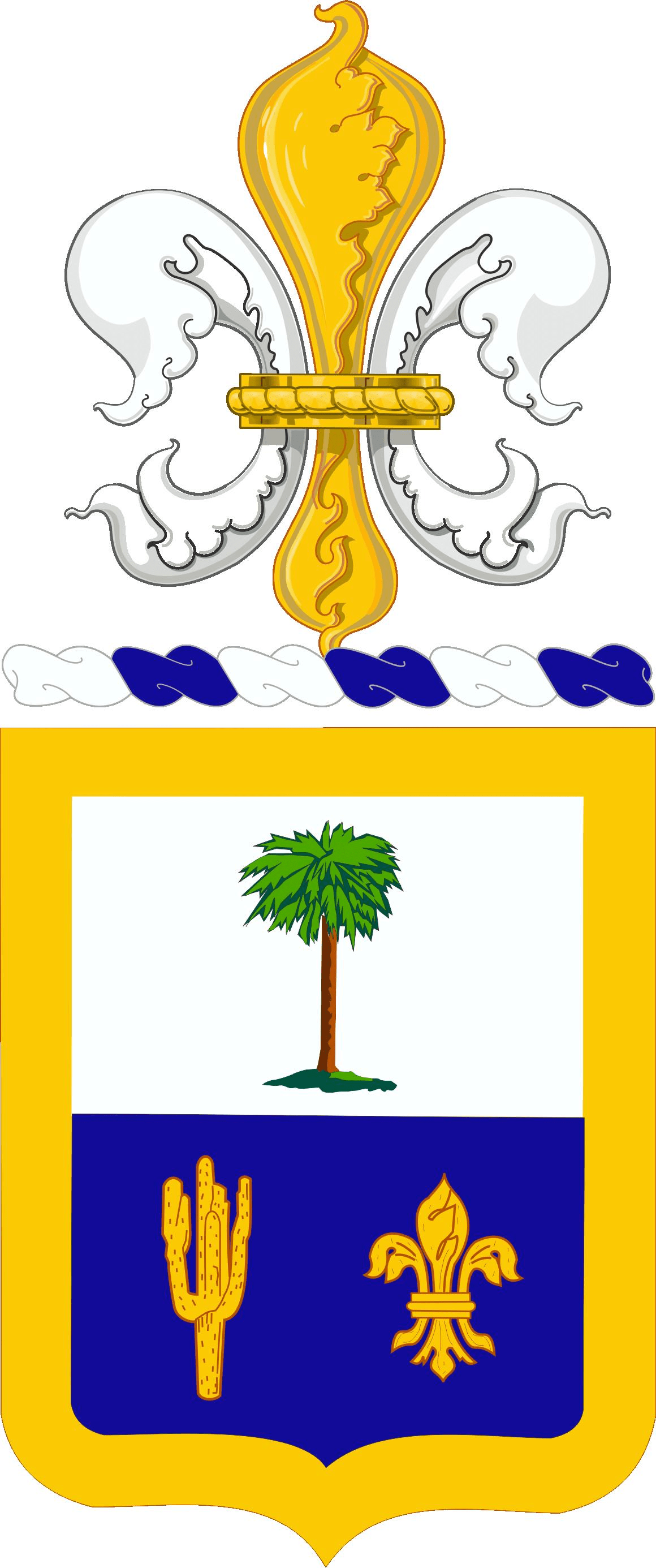
163rd Cavalry
"Strike Hard and Fast!"

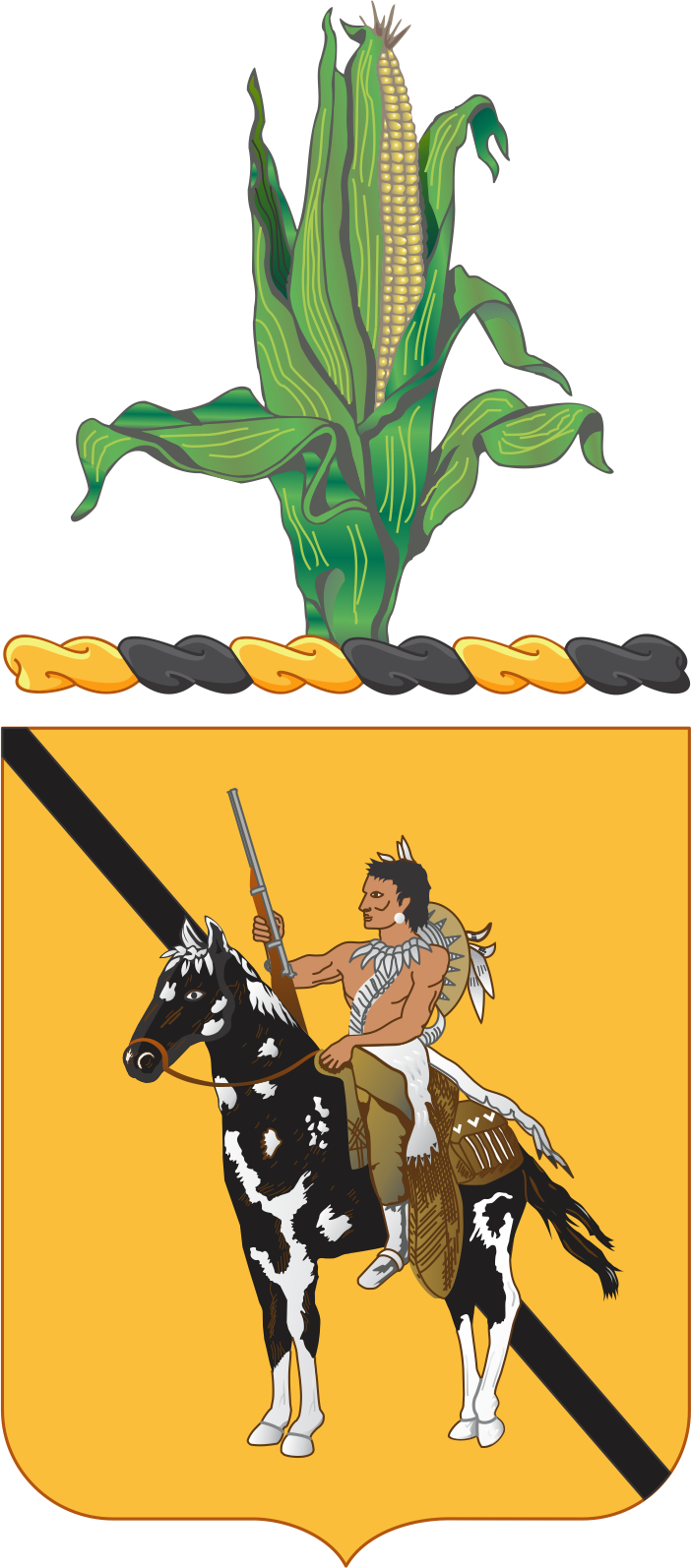
167th Cavalry
"Ti Rah I Kuts" (Bold Ones)

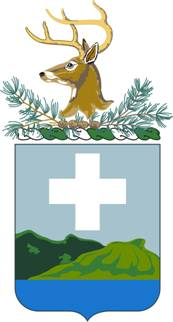
172d Cavalry
(formerly 172d Armor & 172d Infantry)
"Put the Vermonters Ahead"

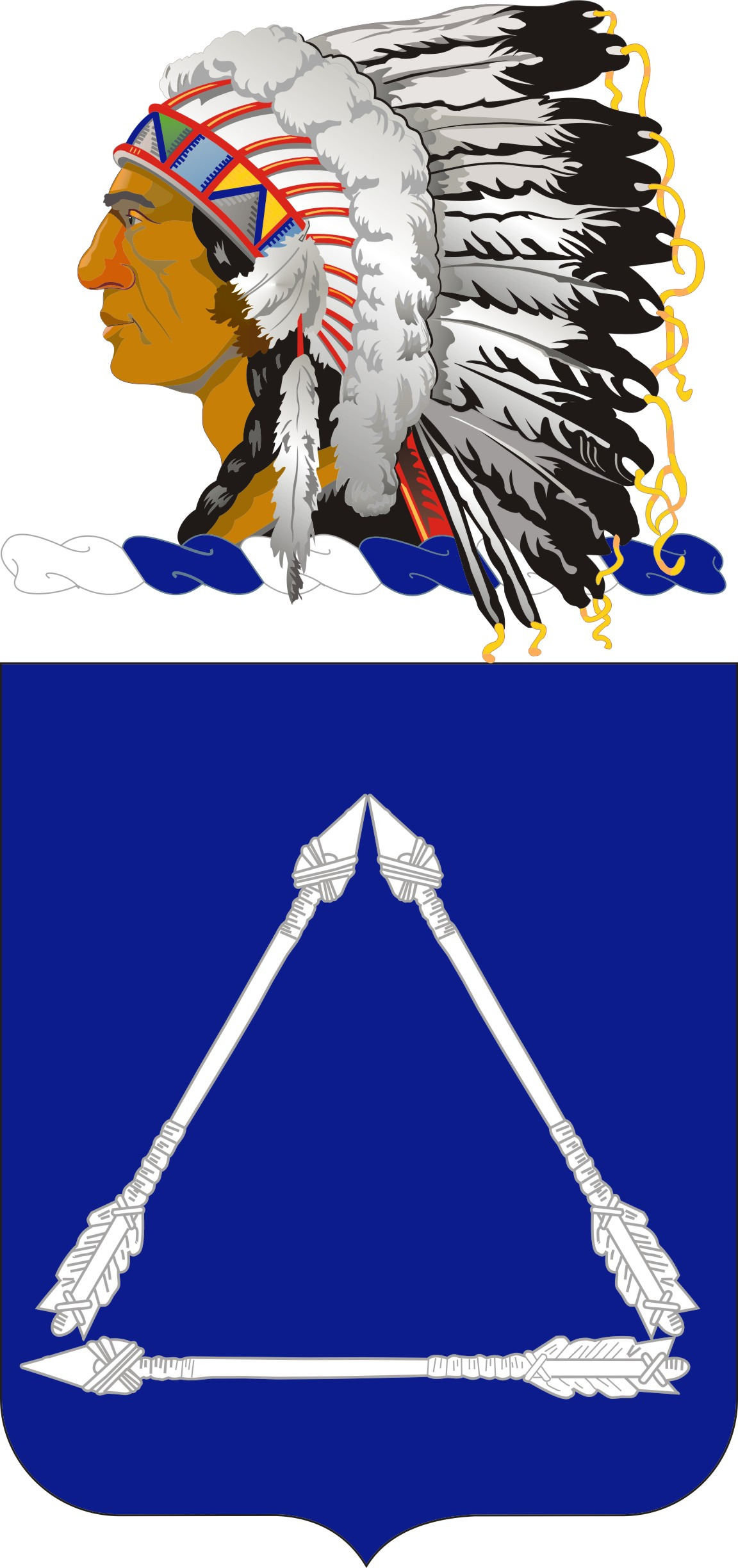
180th Cavalry
(formerly 180th Infantry)
"TANAP-NANAIYKIA-ALTHAIYAHA" (Ready in Peace and War)
"Oklahoma Warriors"

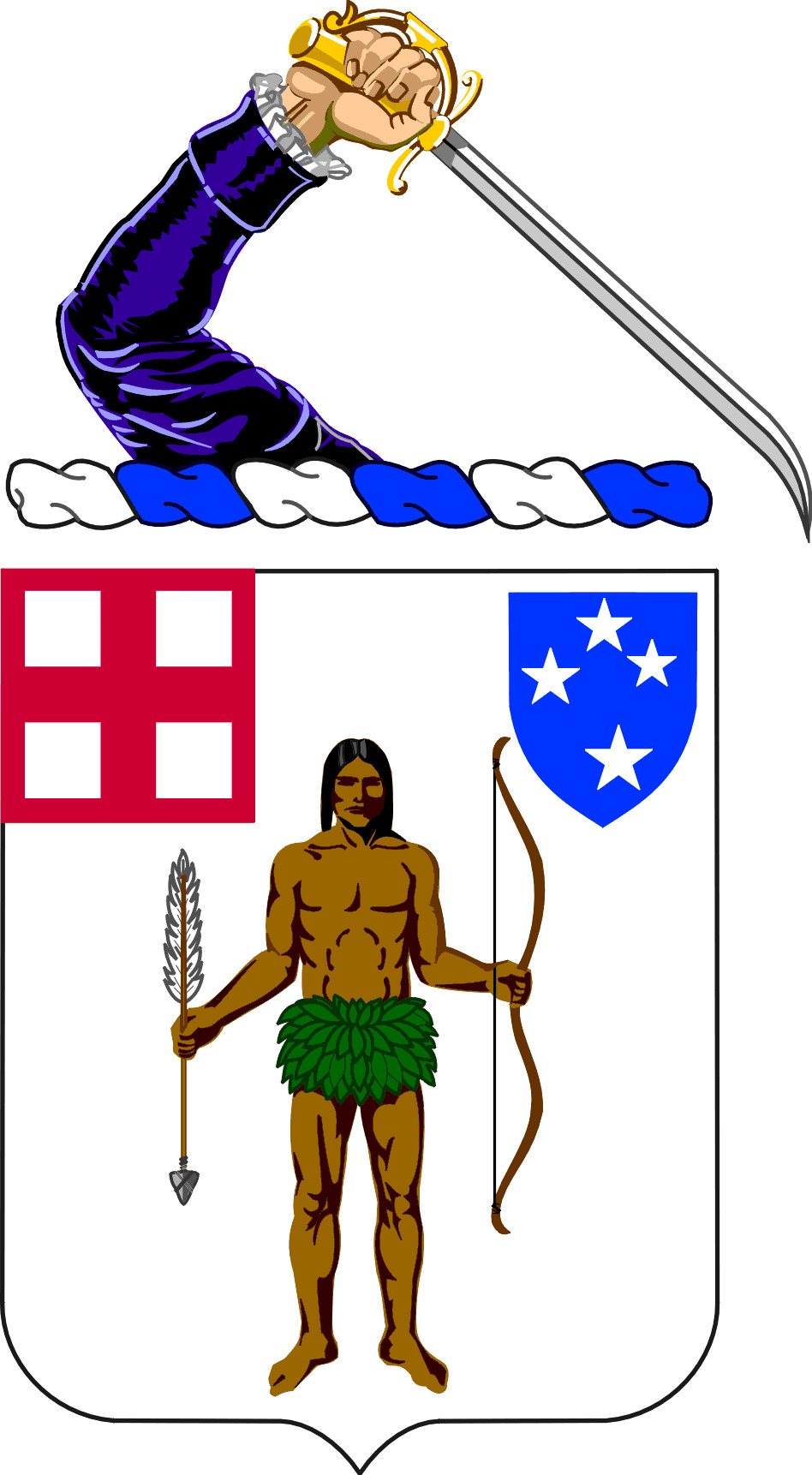
182nd Cavalry
(formerly 182d Infantry)
"Avitos Juvamus Honores" (We Uphold Our Ancient Honors)

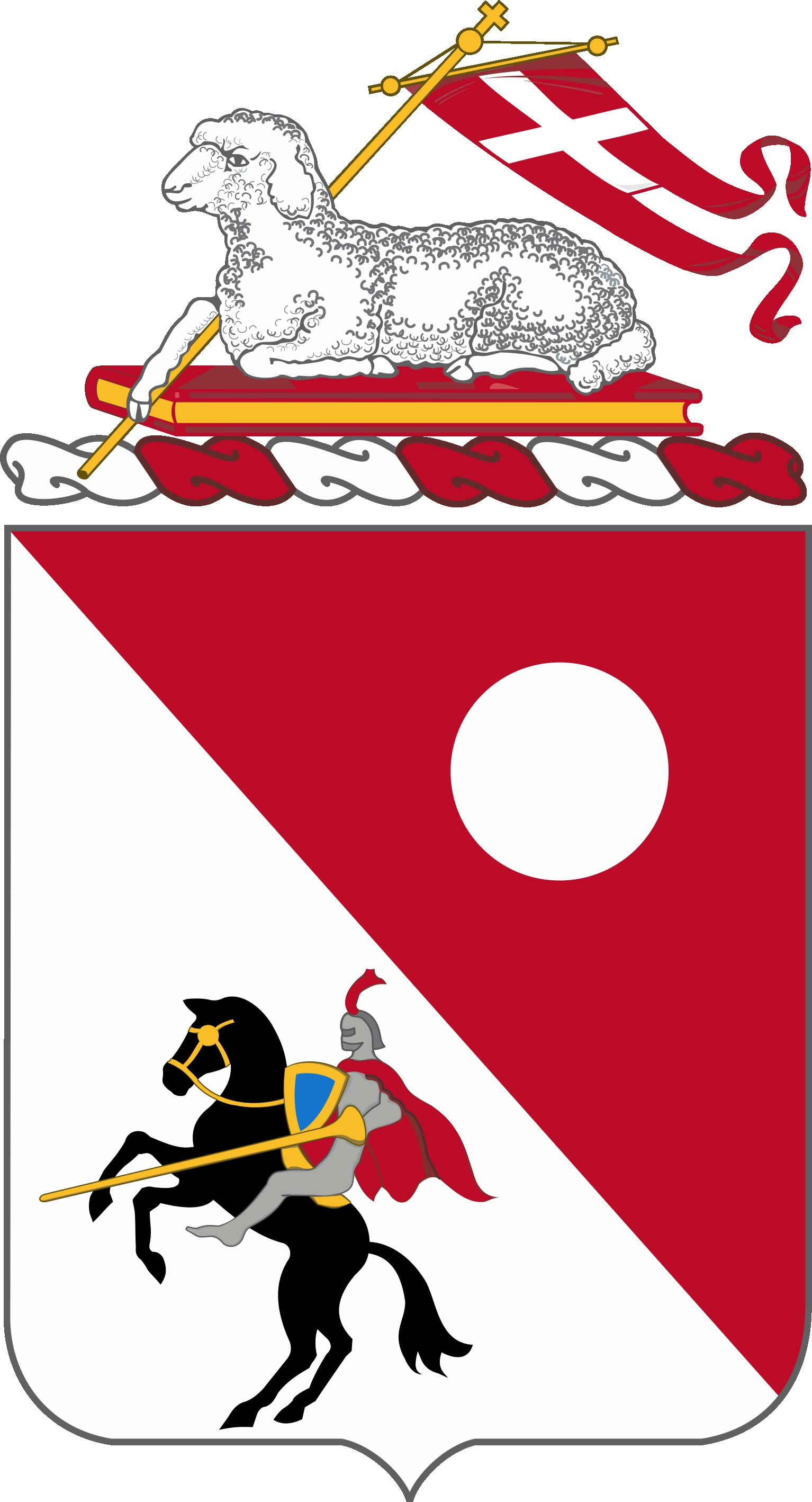
192nd Cavalry
"Caballeriaal Frente" (Scouts Forward)

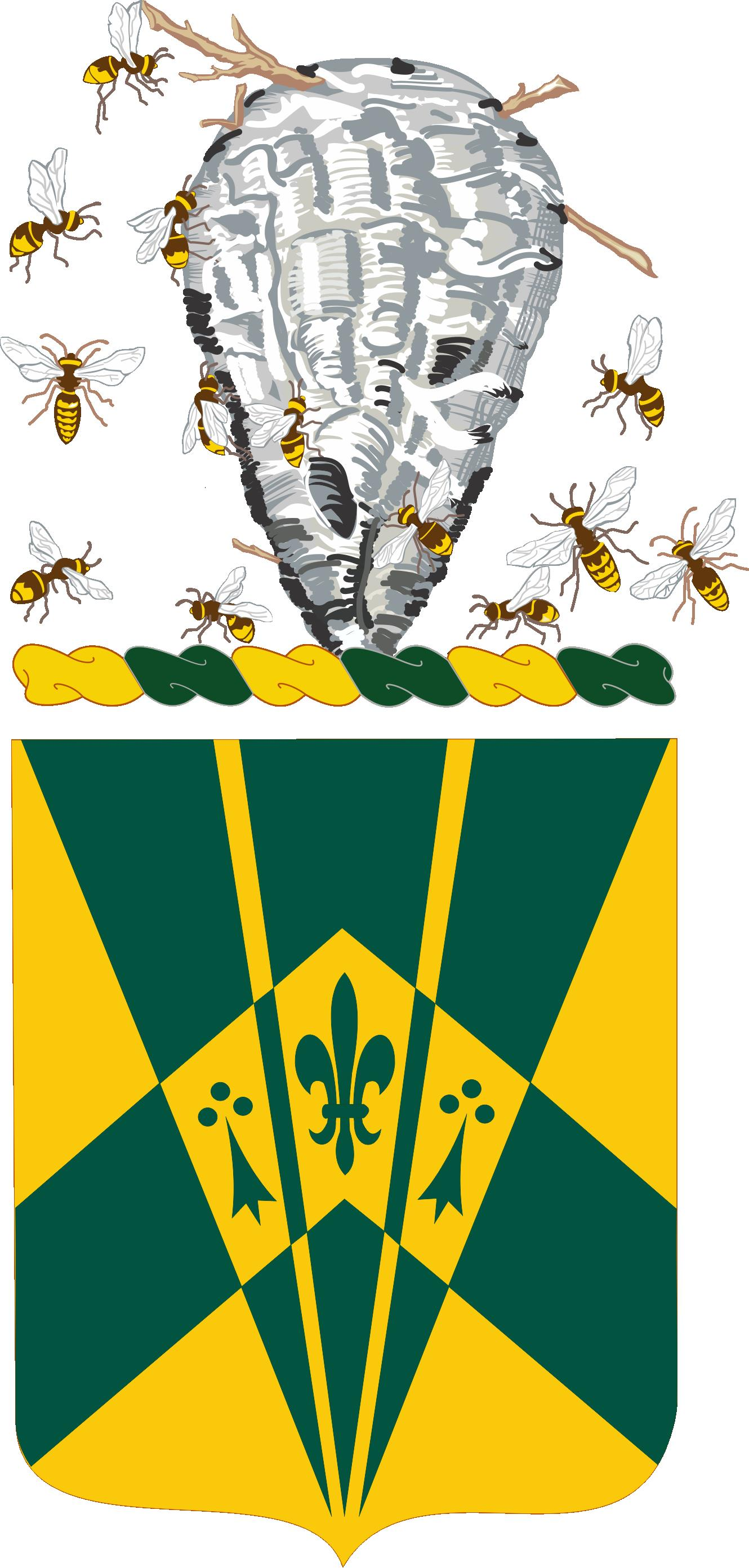
196th Cavalry
"Eyes of Hickory"

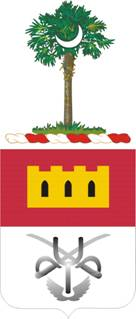
202nd Cavalry
"Guardians of the Low Country"

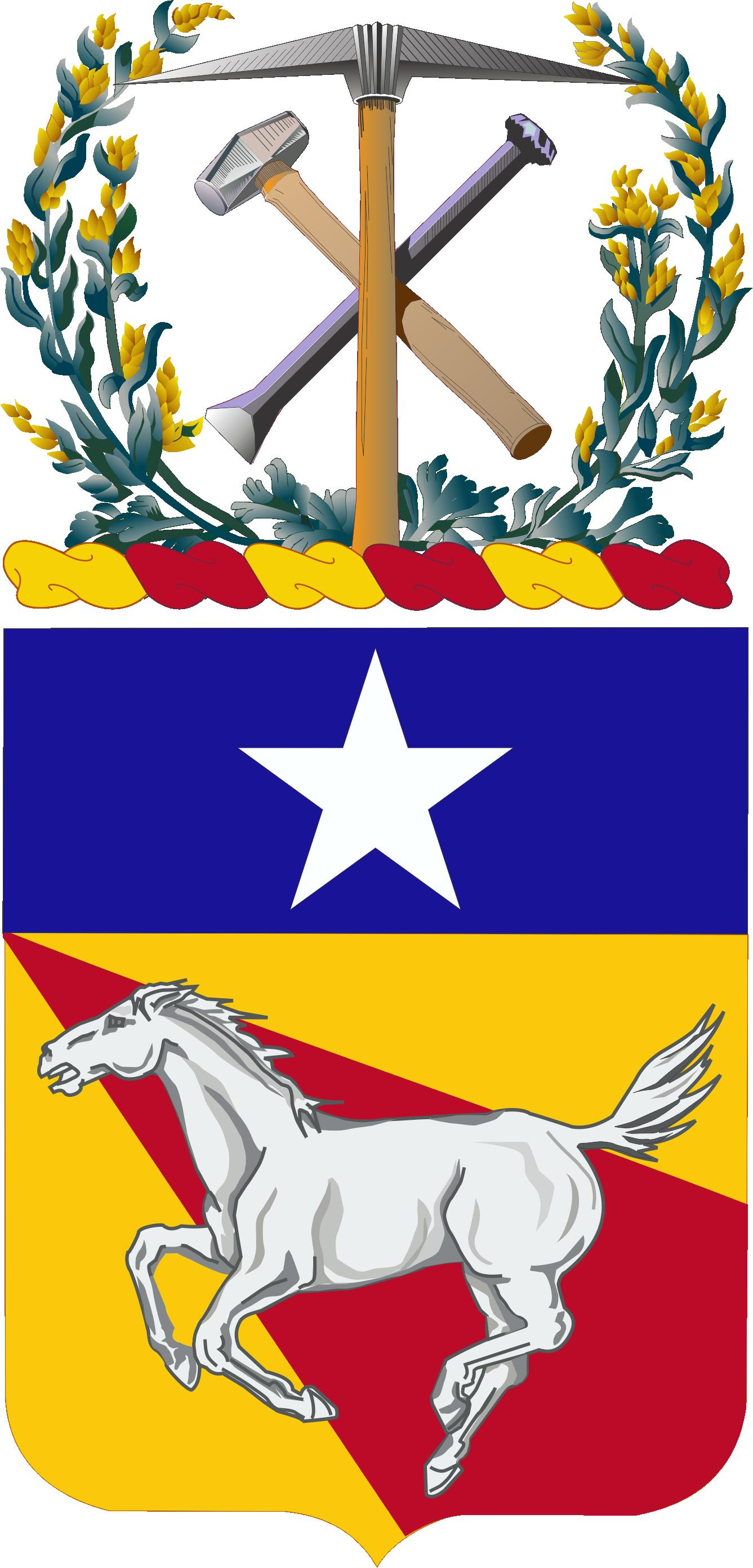
221st Cavalry
(formerly 221st Armor)
"Never Broken"

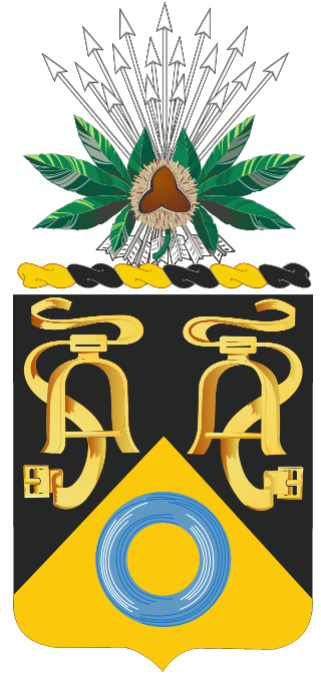
237th Cavalry
"Decision with Might"

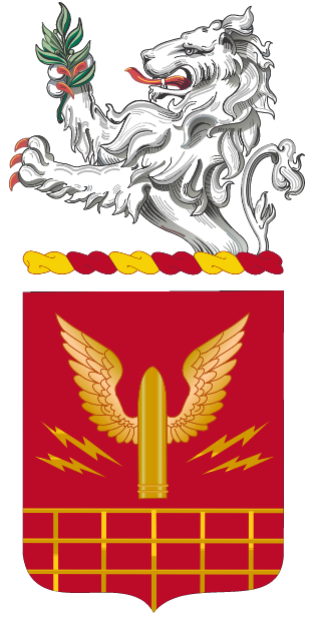
238th Cavalry
"Deo Favente" (With God's Favor)

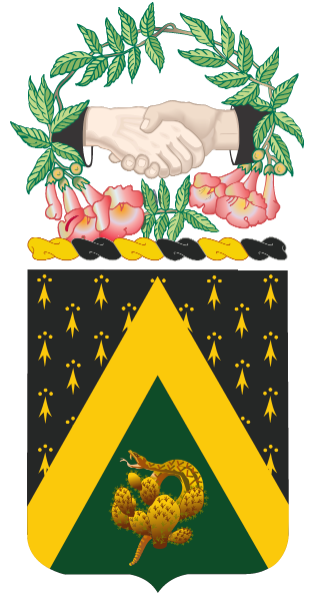
240th Cavalry
"Fight to Defend"

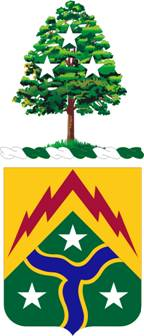
278th Armored Cavalry
"I Volunteer Sir"

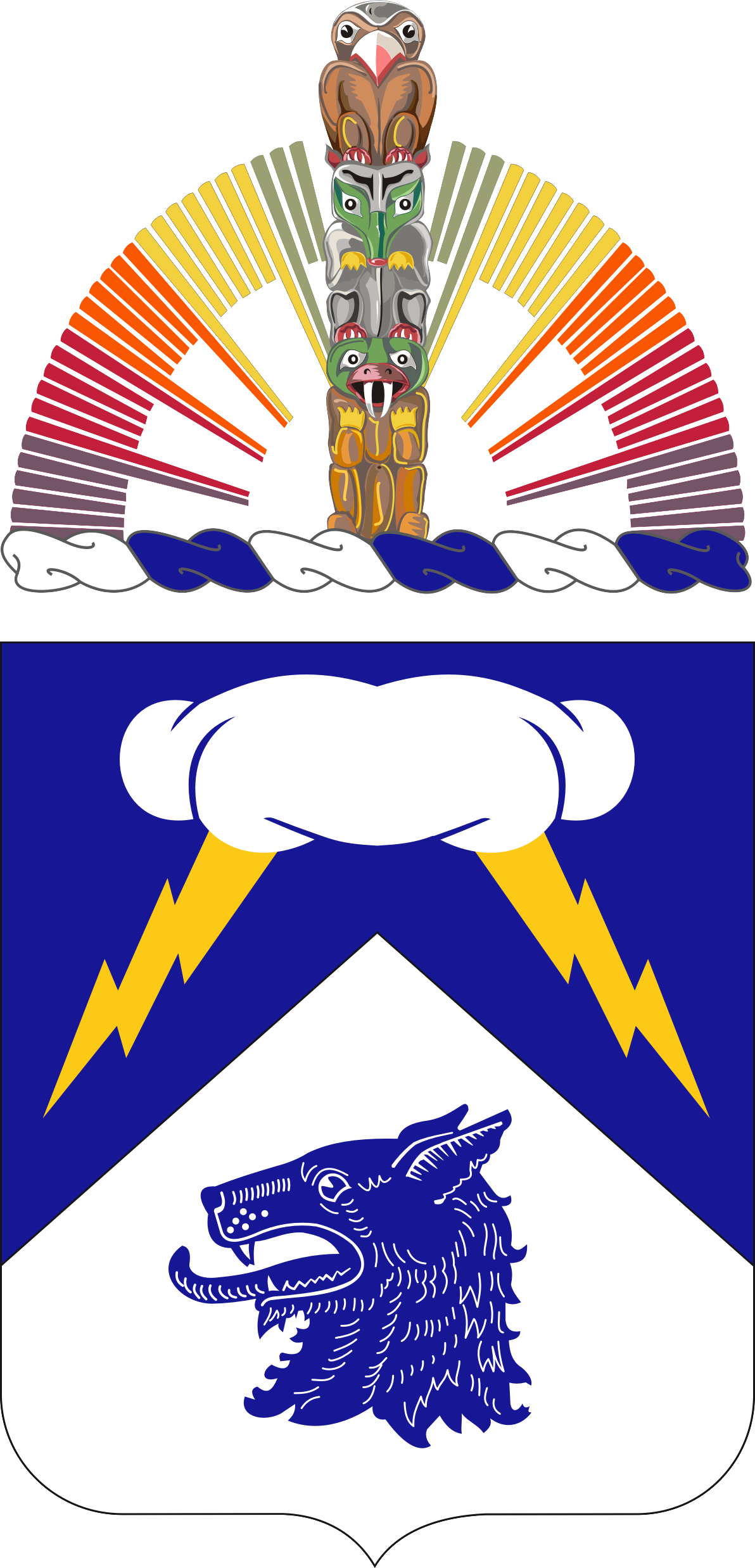
297th Cavalry
"Thunderwolves"

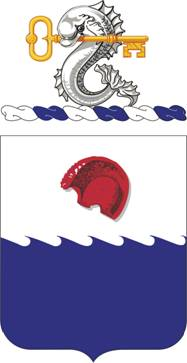
299th Cavalry
(formerly 299th Infantry)
"E MAKAALA KAKOU"

=== 300-on ===
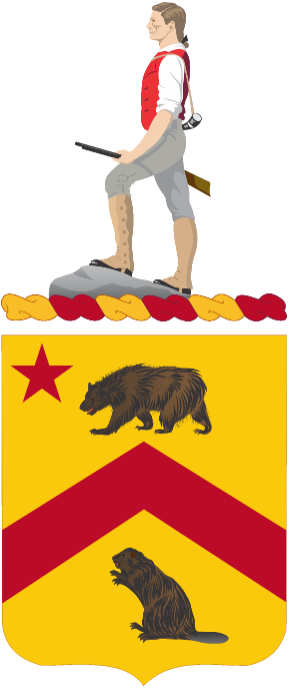
301st Cavalry
"Fort Et Loyal" (Strong and Loyal)

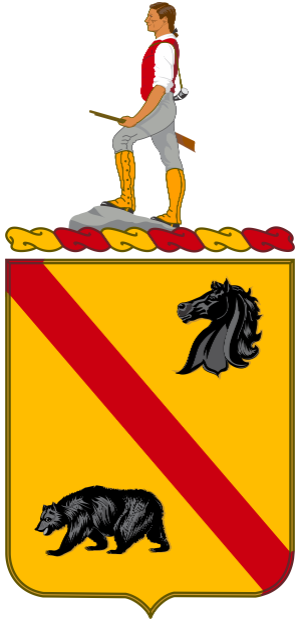
302nd Cavalry
"Celer Eundo; Concurso Ferox" (Swift in March; Bold in Attack)

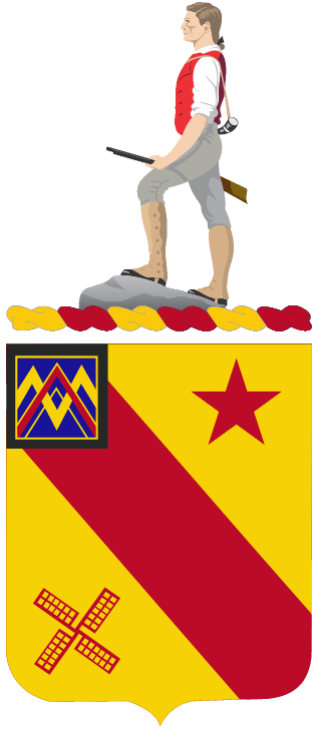
303rd Cavalry
(Army Reserve)
"Toujours Pret et Audacieux" (Always Ready and Fearless)

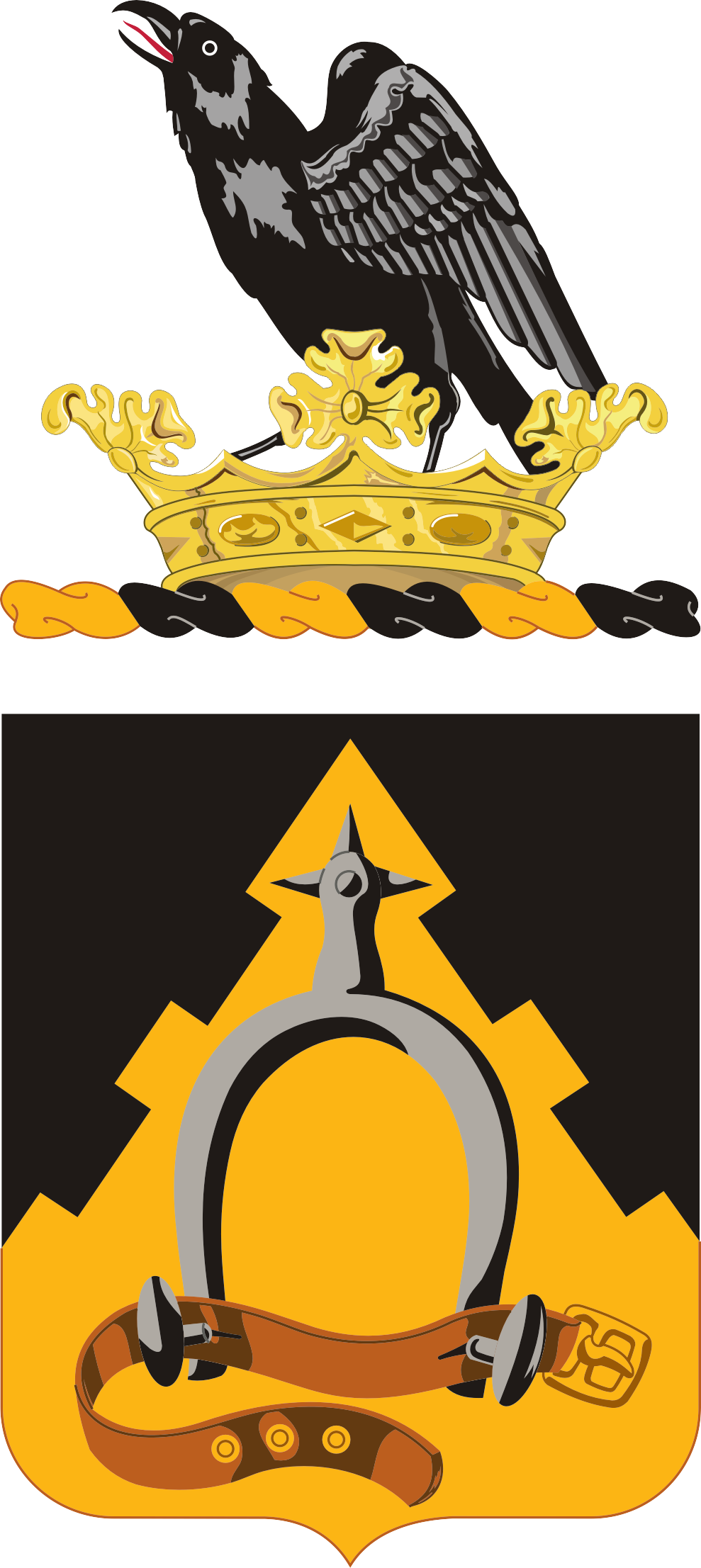
303rd Cavalry
(Washington Army National Guard)
"Always in the lead"

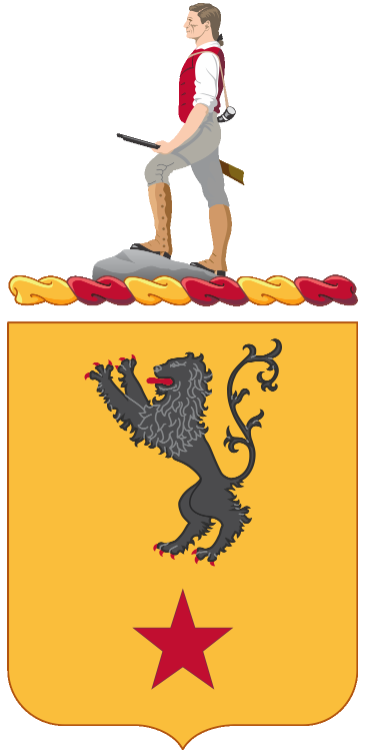
304th Cavalry
"El Leon Salta" (The Lion Springs)

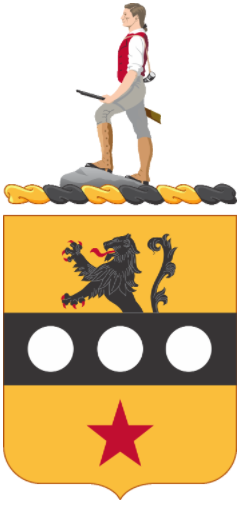
305th Cavalry
"Spectemur Agendo" (Let Us Be Judged By Our Actions)

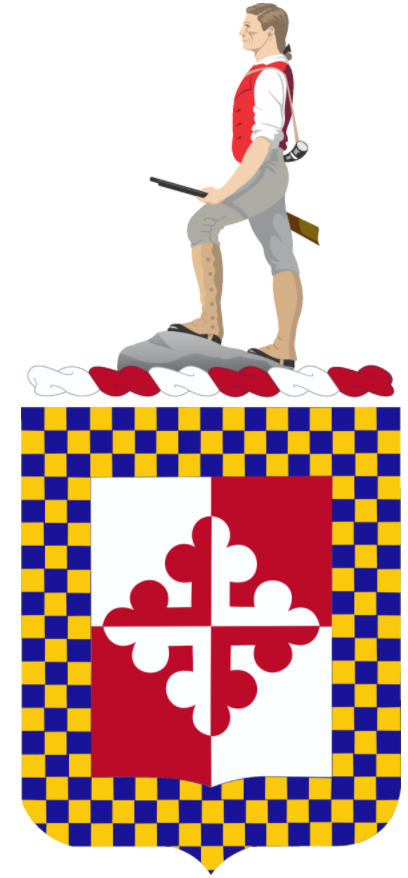
306th Cavalry
"Forward"

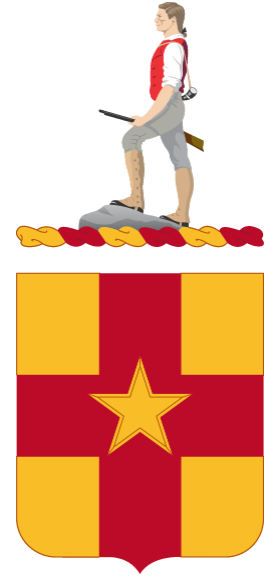
307th Cavalry
"Perseverandum" (Persevering)

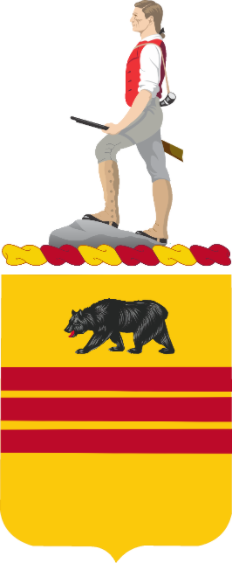
308th Cavalry
"Nunquam non paratus" (Never Unprepared)

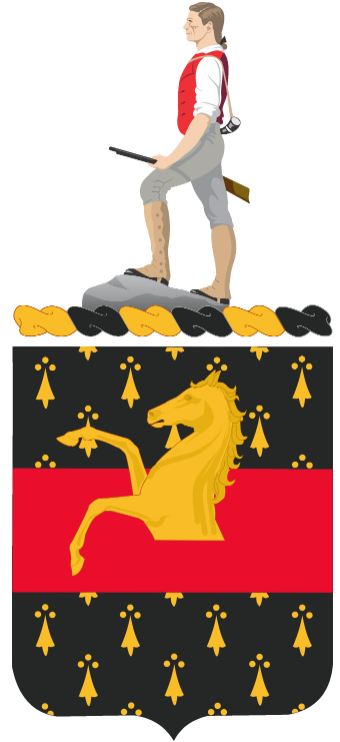
309th Cavalry
"Anima Fortuna Sequitur" (Fortune Follows Courage)

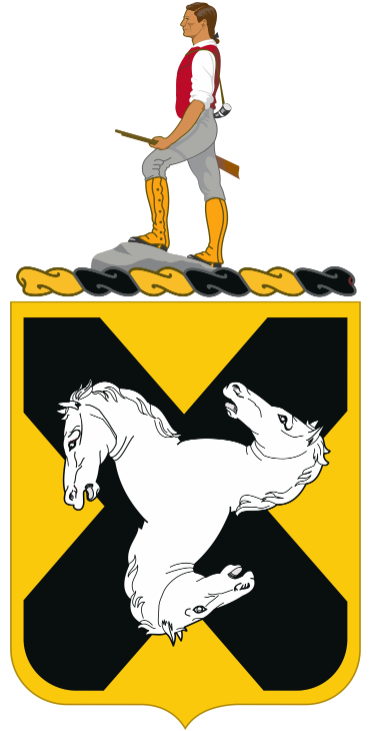
310th Cavalry
"Fidelis" (Faithful)

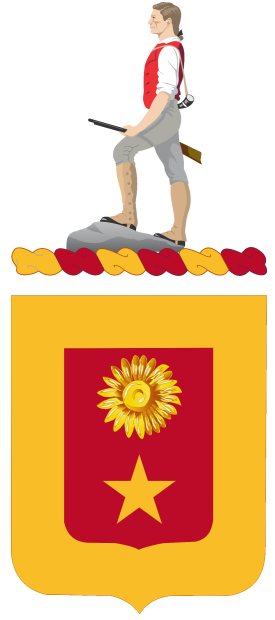
311th Cavalry
"Siempre Adelante" (Always Forward)

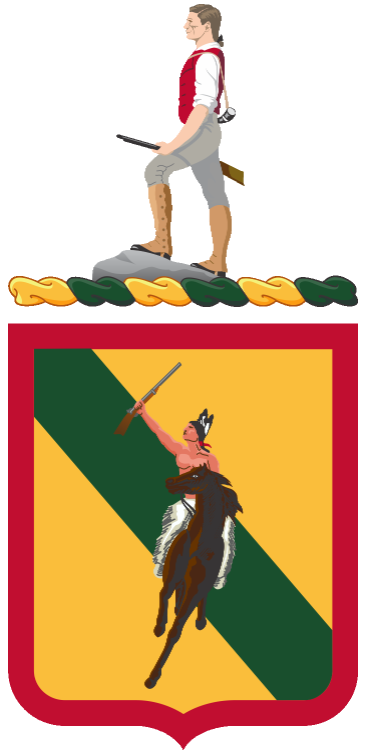
312th Cavalry
"Omnia Virtute" (All by Valor)

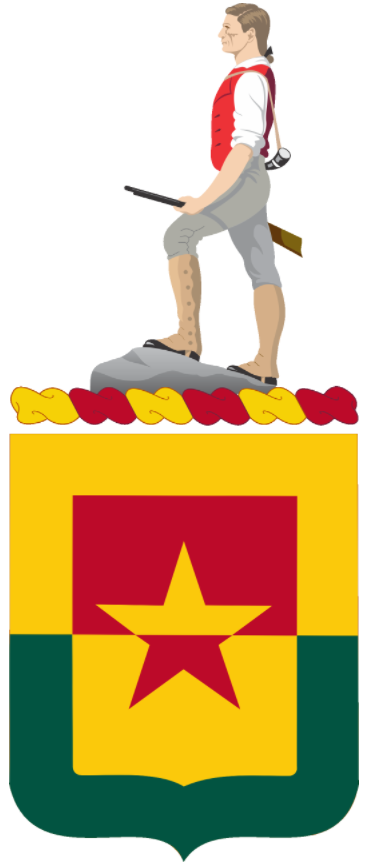
313th Cavalry
"We Also Serve"

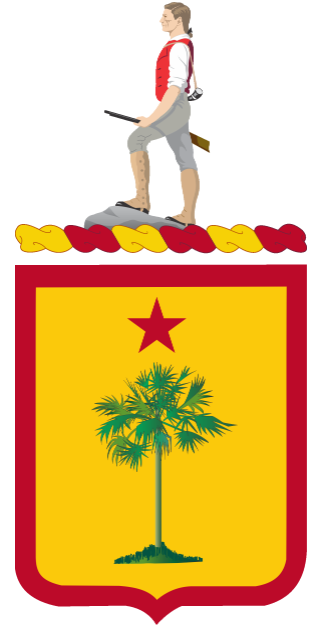
314th Cavalry
"Unity and Speed"

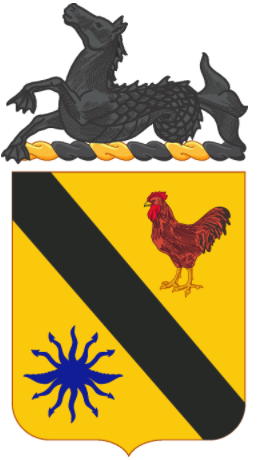
315th Cavalry
"See Only Victory"

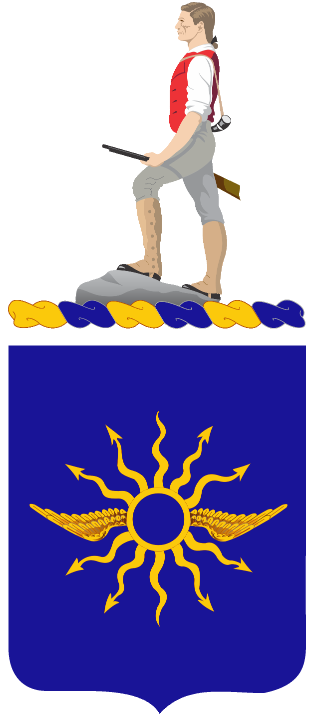
316th Cavalry
"Pata Concita Fulmnt Nati" (The Fatherland having been aroused, its sons thunder forth)

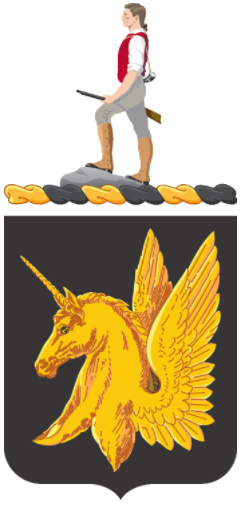
317th Cavalry
"Audax Et Vigilans" (Daring and Vigilant)

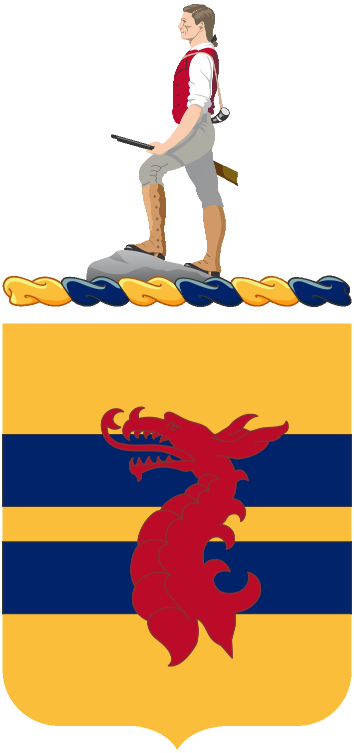
318th Cavalry
"Fide Et Animis" (By Faith and Courage)

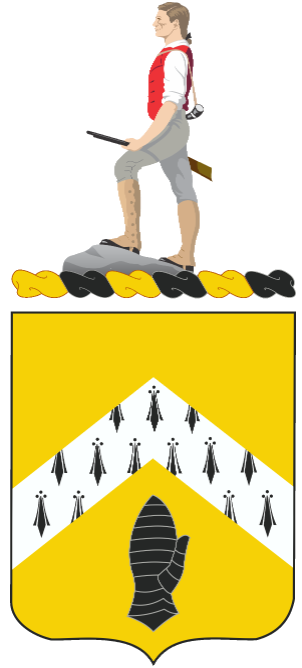
319th Cavalry
"Lead Me Forward"

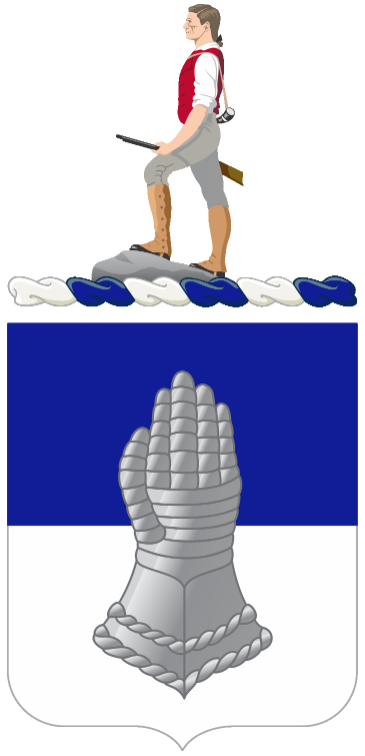
320th Cavalry
"Semper Paratus" (Always Ready)

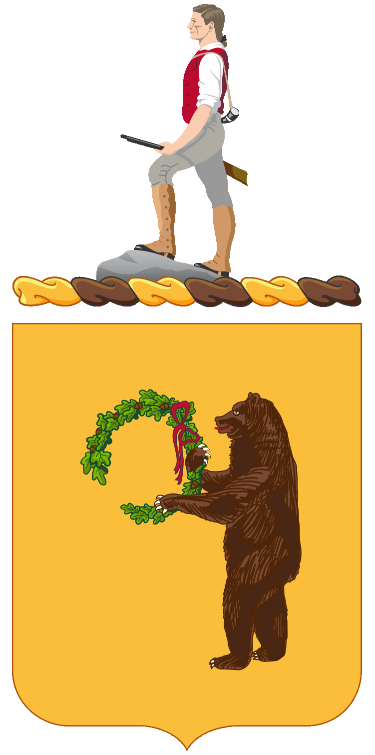
321st Cavalry
"Tiens ta Foi" (Hold thy Faith)

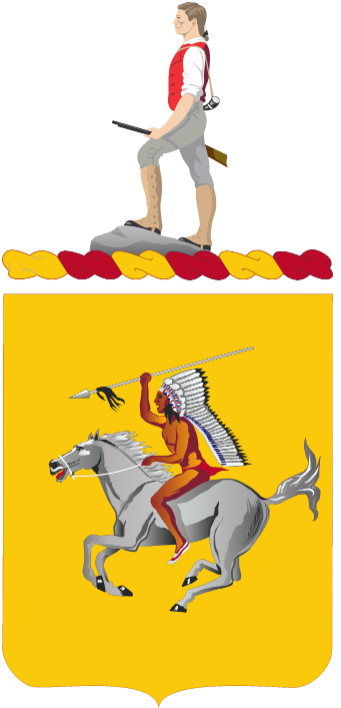
322nd Cavalry
"Audacter et Strenue" (Strongly and Boldly)

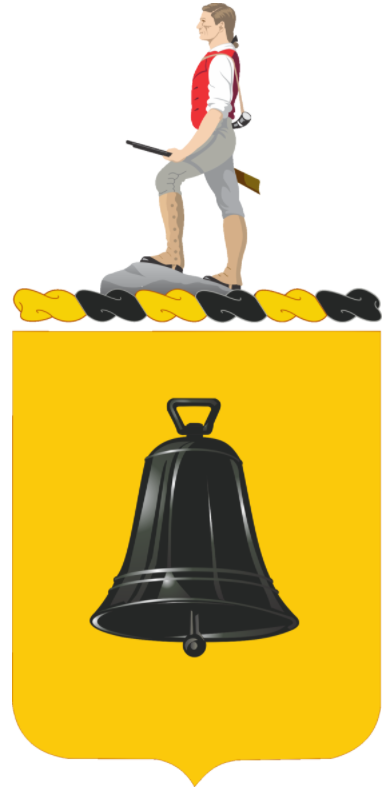
323rd Cavalry
"Primero" (First)

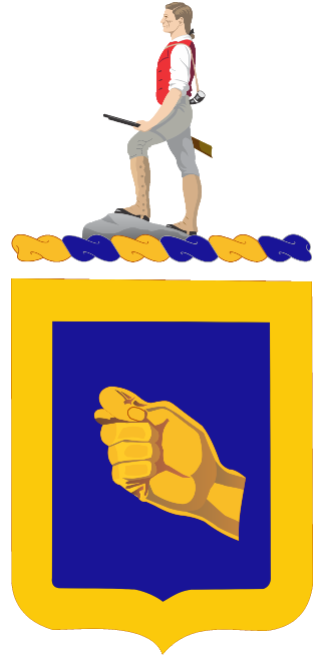
324th Cavalry
"Mah be-ah" (We Defy)

== Chemical units ==
=== 1 to 400 ===
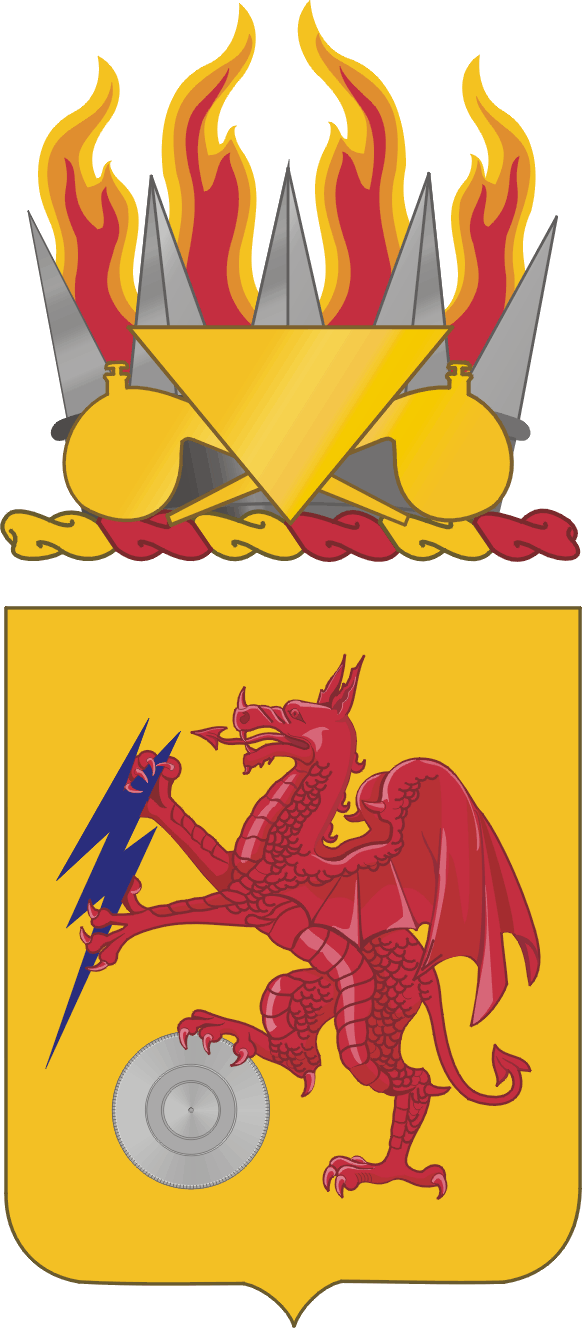
2nd Chemical Battalion
"Flammis Vincimus" (With Fire, We Conquer)

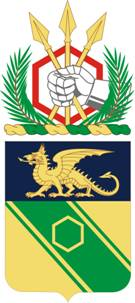
22nd Chemical Battalion
"Tempora Mutantur et Nos Mutamur in Illis" (The Times are Changed and We Are Changed With Them)

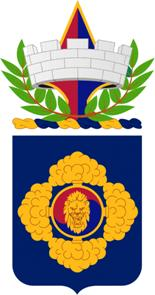
23rd Chemical Battalion
"Two Joined As One"

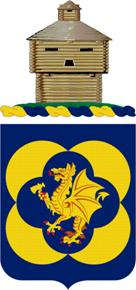
44th Chemical Battalion
"Pride Integrity Courage"

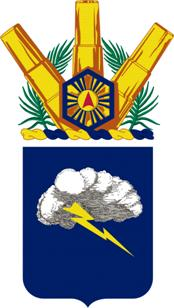
82nd Chemical Battalion
"Post Nubila Victoria" (After The Clouds, Victory)

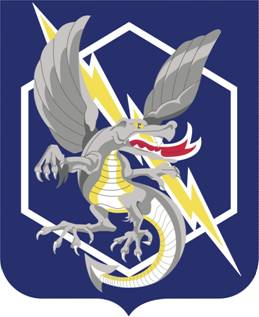
83rd Chemical Battalion
"Confront Any Mission"

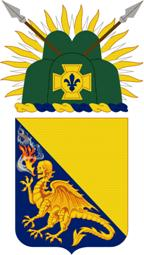
84th Chemical Battalion
"Cave Fumo" (Beware, the Fumes)

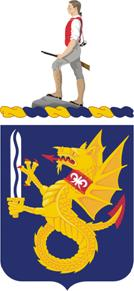
92nd Chemical Battalion
"Hide Behind Me"

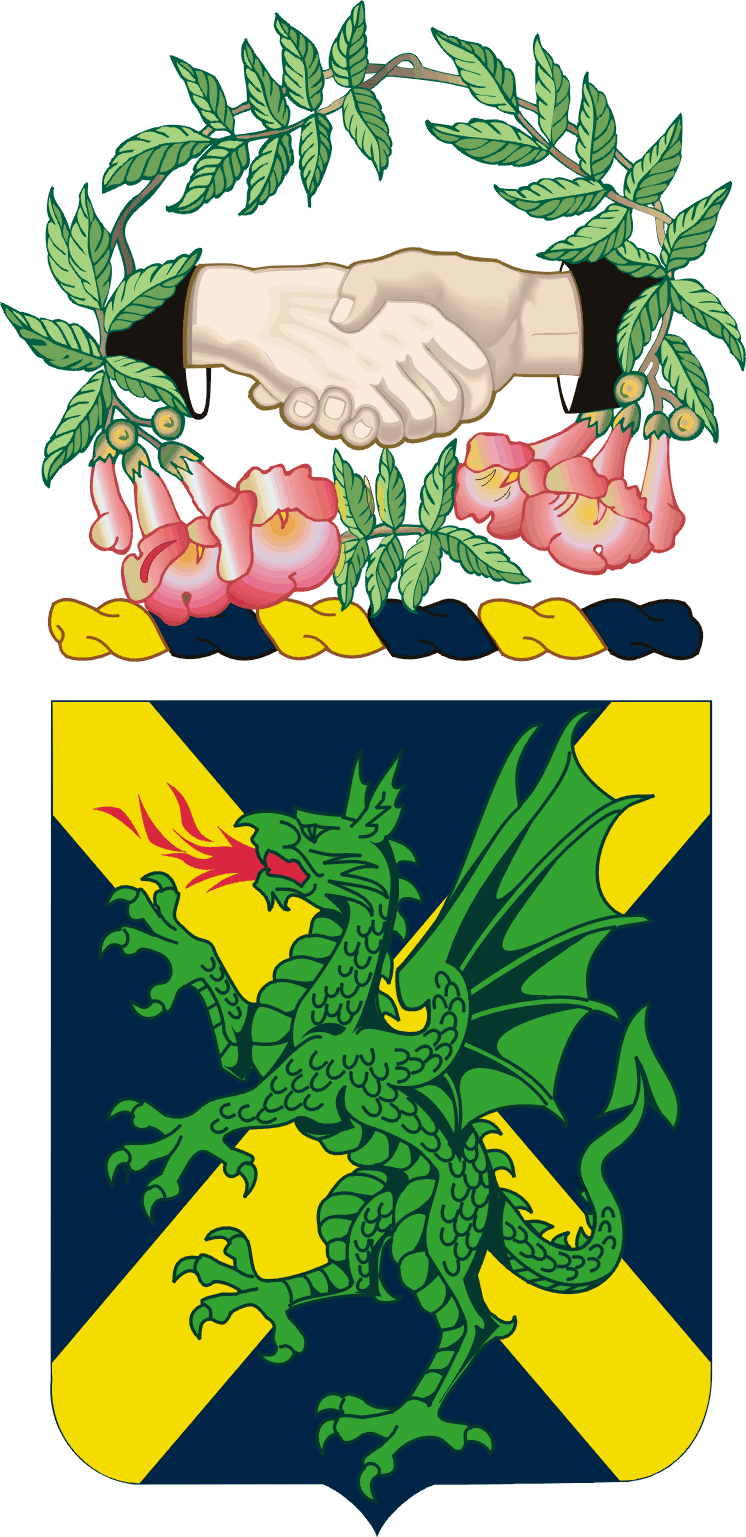
103rd Chemical Battalion
"Stabilis Victoria" (Support The Victory)

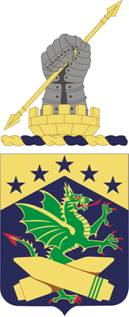
110th Chemical Battalion
"Utmost"

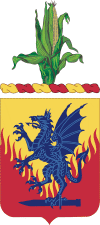
126th Chemical Battalion
"Through The Flames"

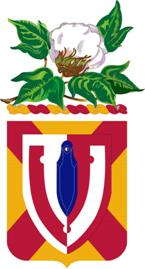
145th Chemical Battalion
"We Can Adapt"

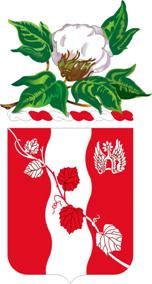
151st Chemical Battalion
"Get There First"

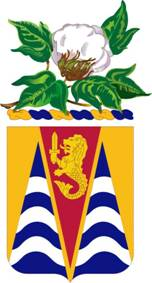
152nd Chemical Battalion
"Ready Without Reason"

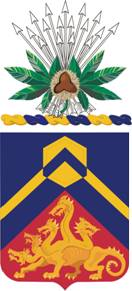
155th Chemical Battalion
"The Fog of War"

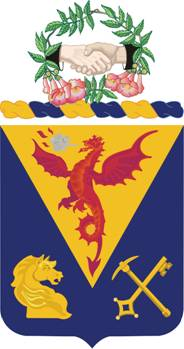
206th Chemical Battalion
"Flamma Fumo est Proxima" (Fire Follows Smoke)

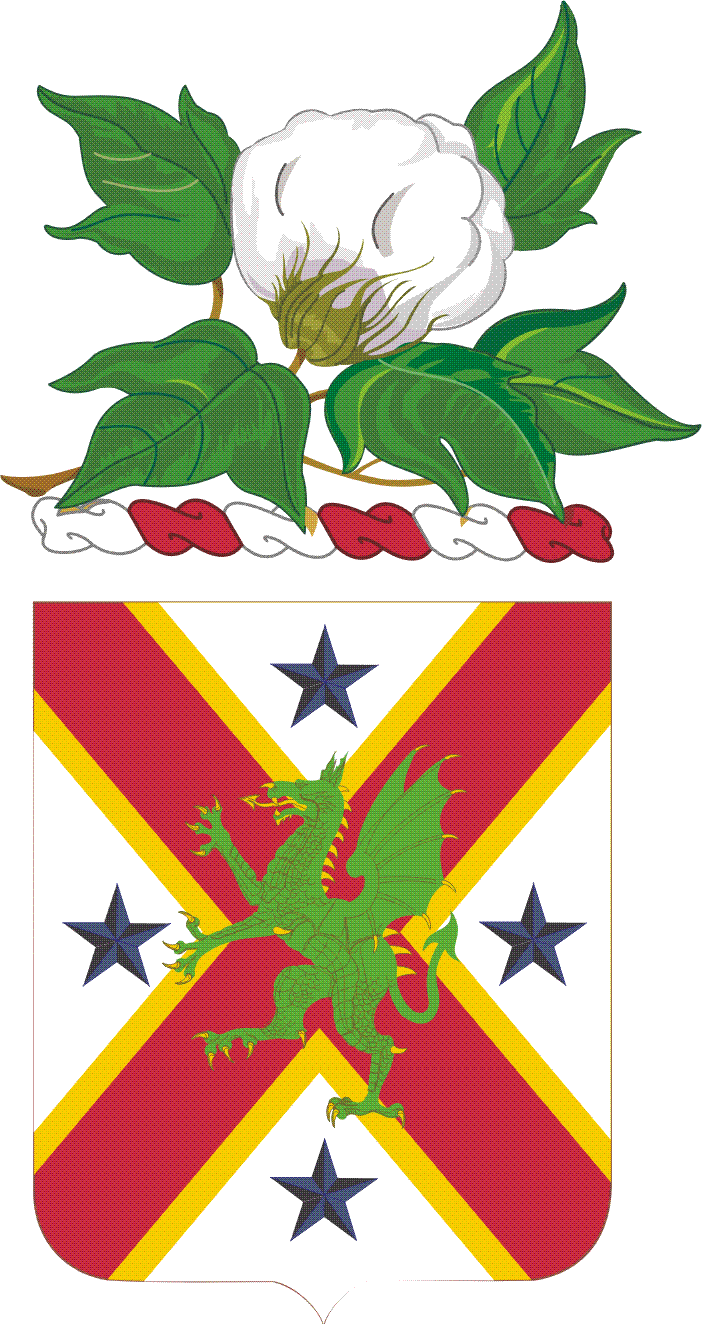
278th Chemical Battalion
"Defensori Visium" (Protectors of the Force)

=== 400 to 500 ===
420th Chemical Battalion
"Passage Assured"

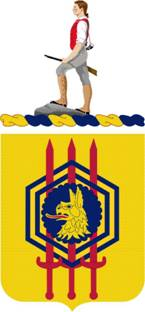
450th Chemical Battalion
"Shield the Soldier"

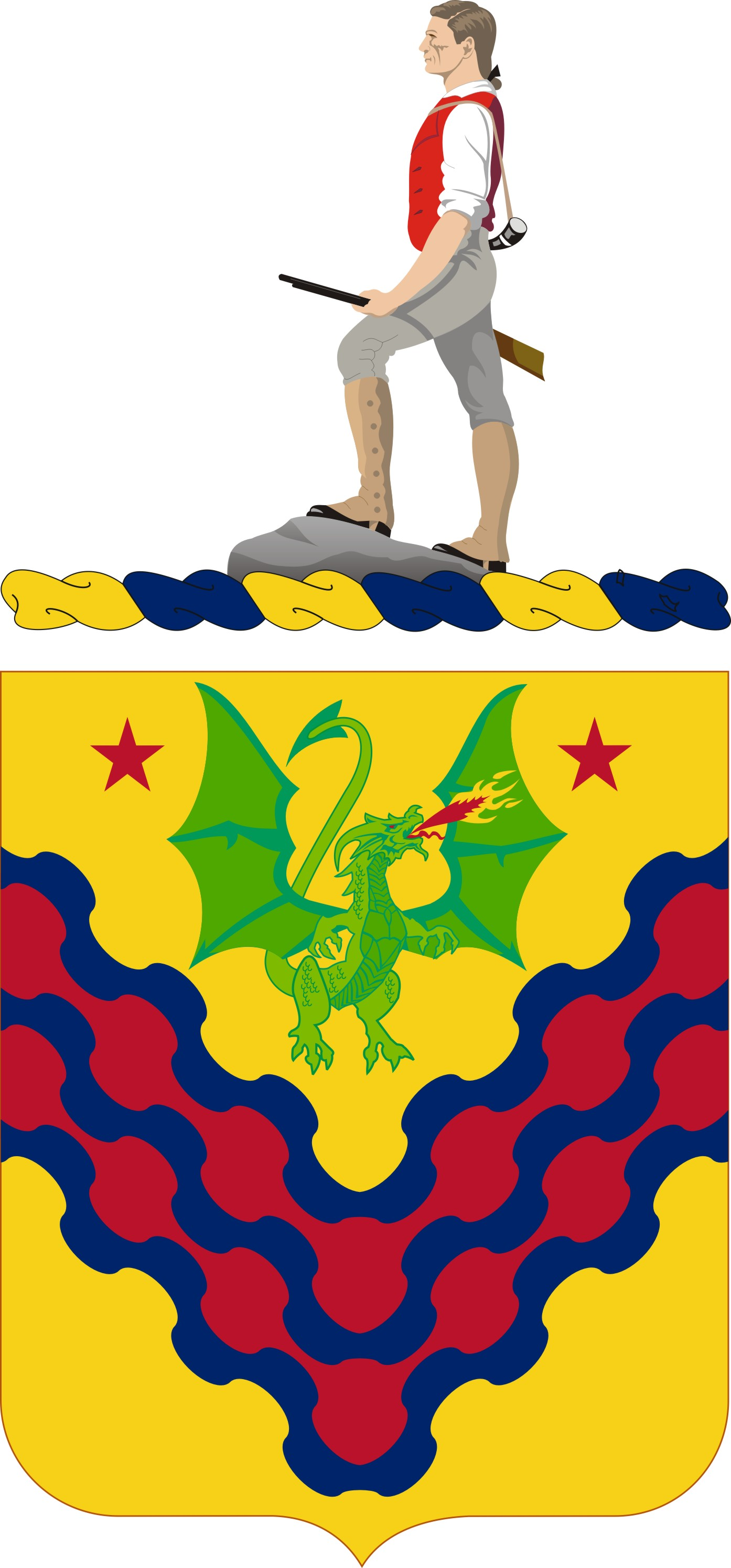
453rd Chemical Battalion
"Invictus Scutum" (Invincible Shield)

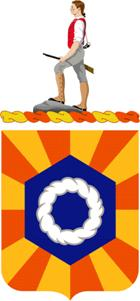
457th Chemical Battalion
"Cover the Attack!"

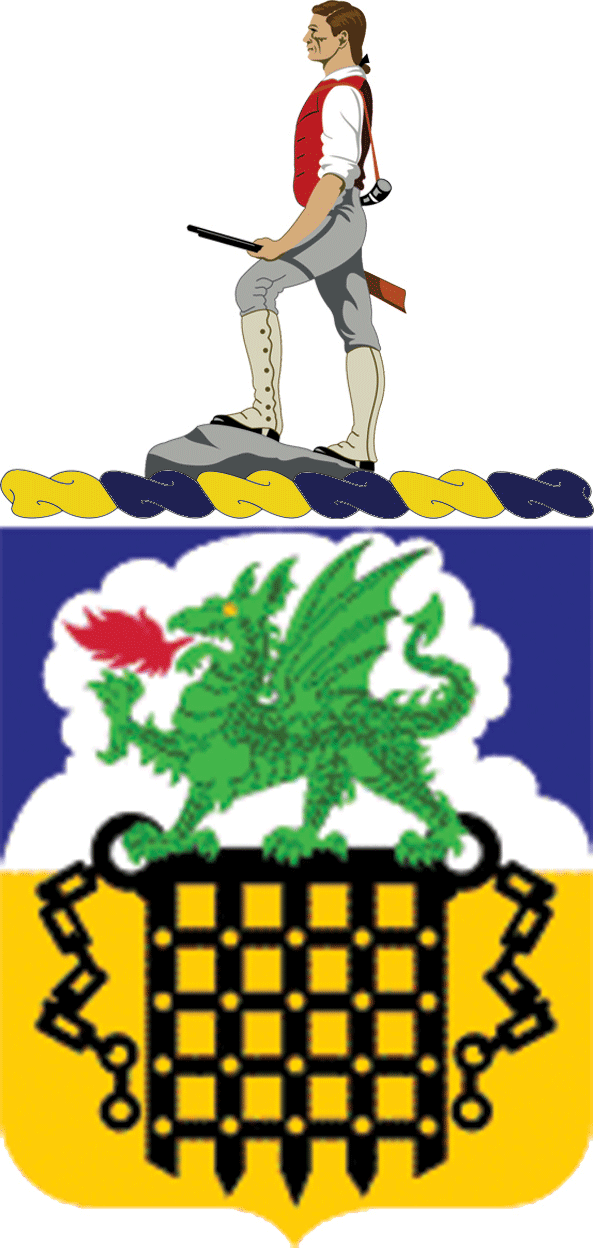
468th Chemical Battalion
"Viel of the Dragon"

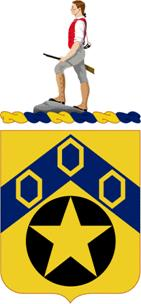
472nd Chemical Battalion
"Provide the Way"

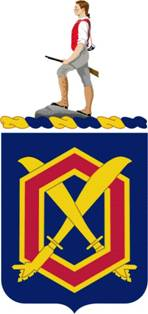
476th Chemical Battalion
"Protect the Force"

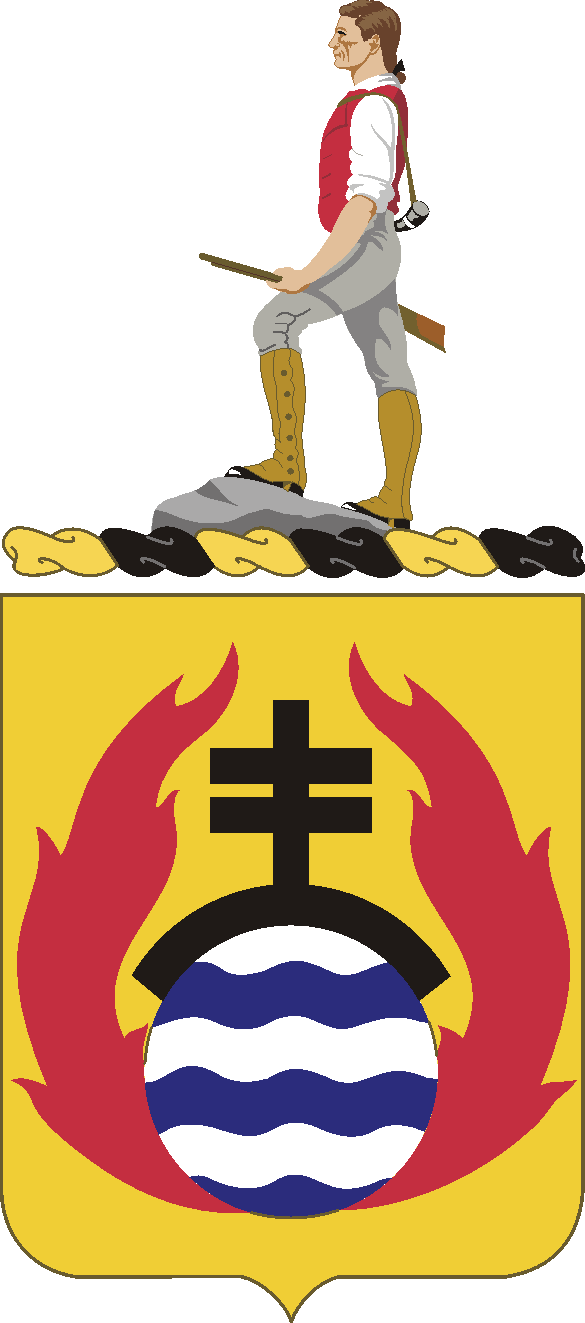
479th Chemical Battalion
"Command, Serve, Operate"

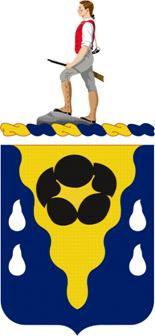
485th Chemical Battalion
"Rendering Excellence"

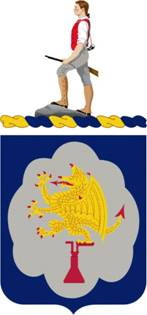
490th Chemical Battalion
"Smoke Fight"

== Civil Affairs units ==
=== 1 to 100 ===
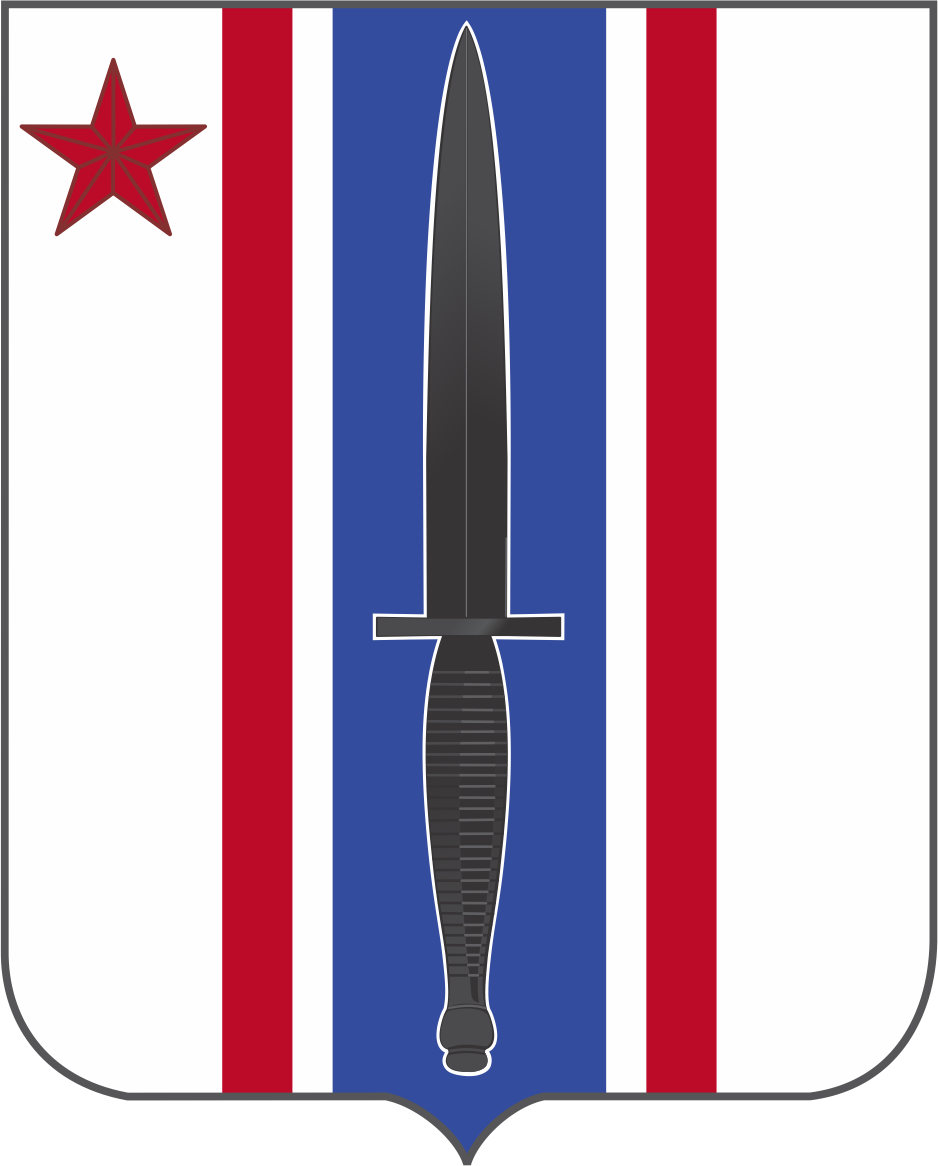
80th Civil Affairs Battalion
"Victory at all Cost"

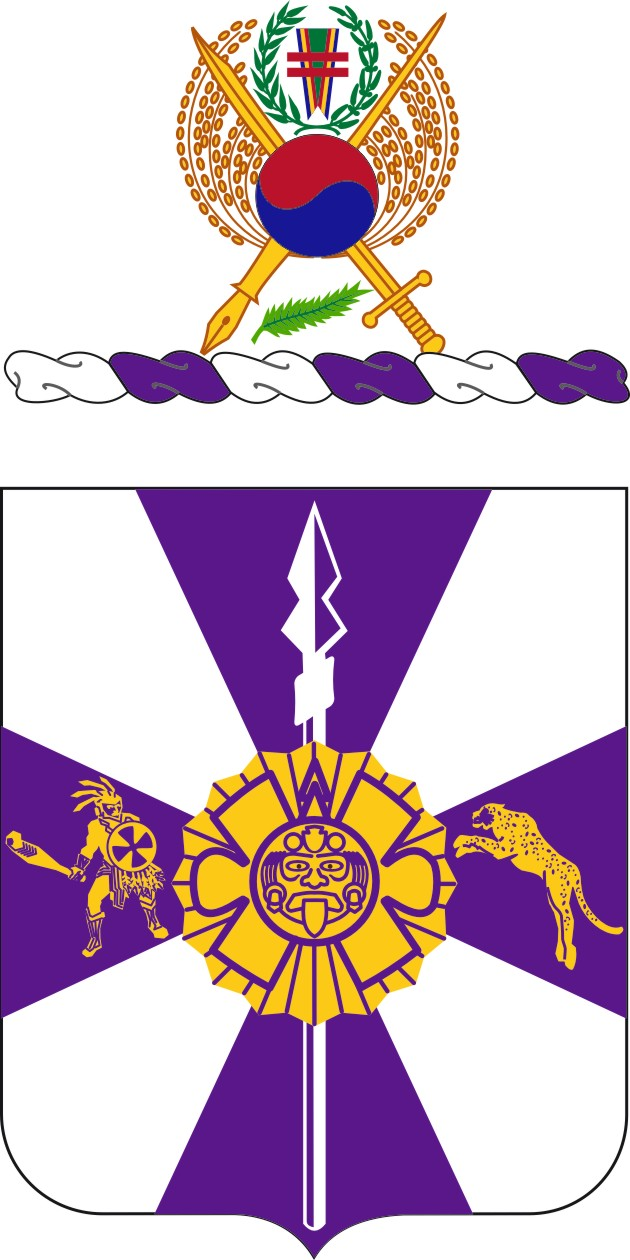
81st Civil Affairs Battalion
"Honor sin Miedo" (Fearless Honor)

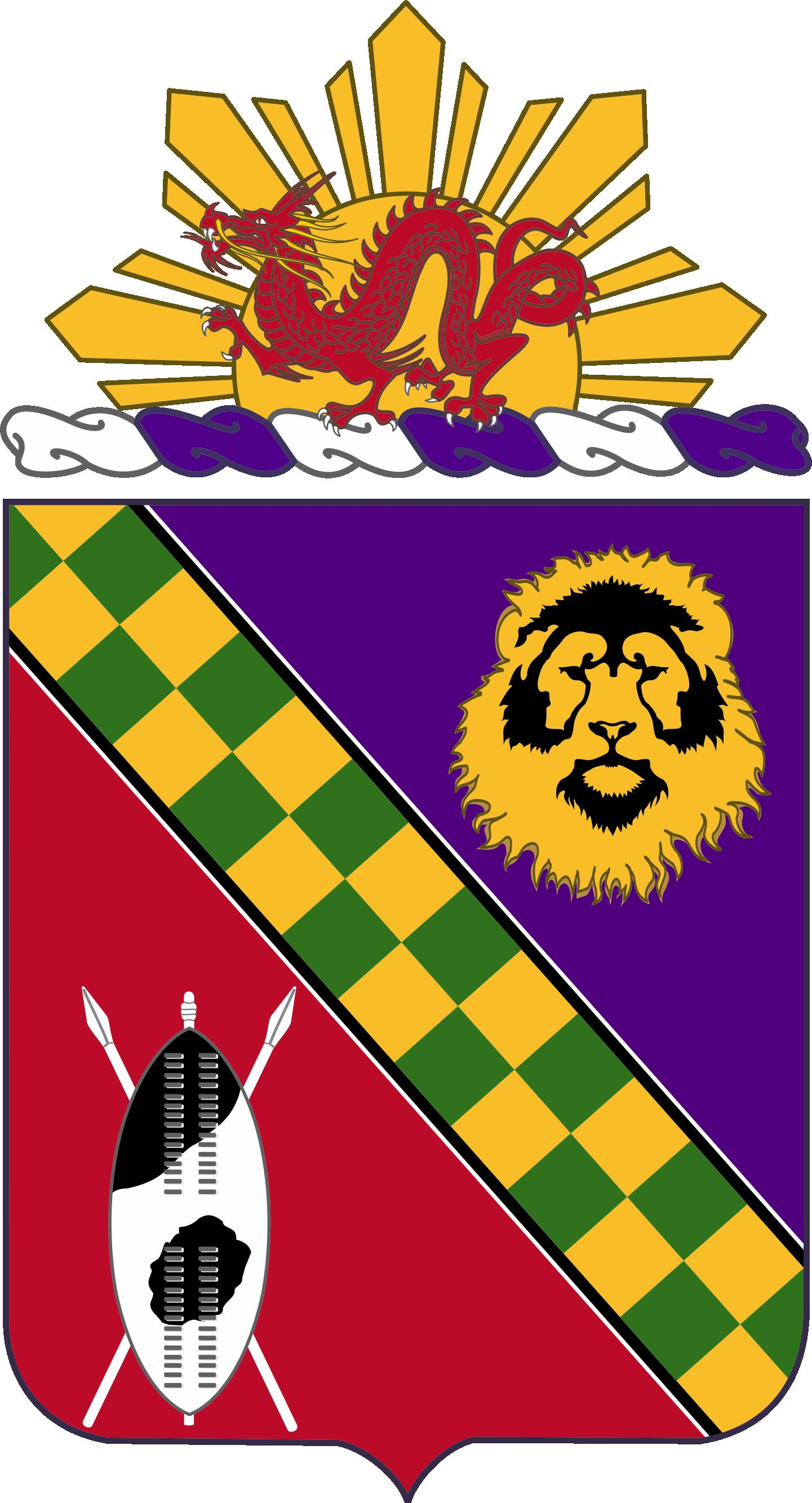
82nd Civil Affairs Battalion
"Victory's Forge"

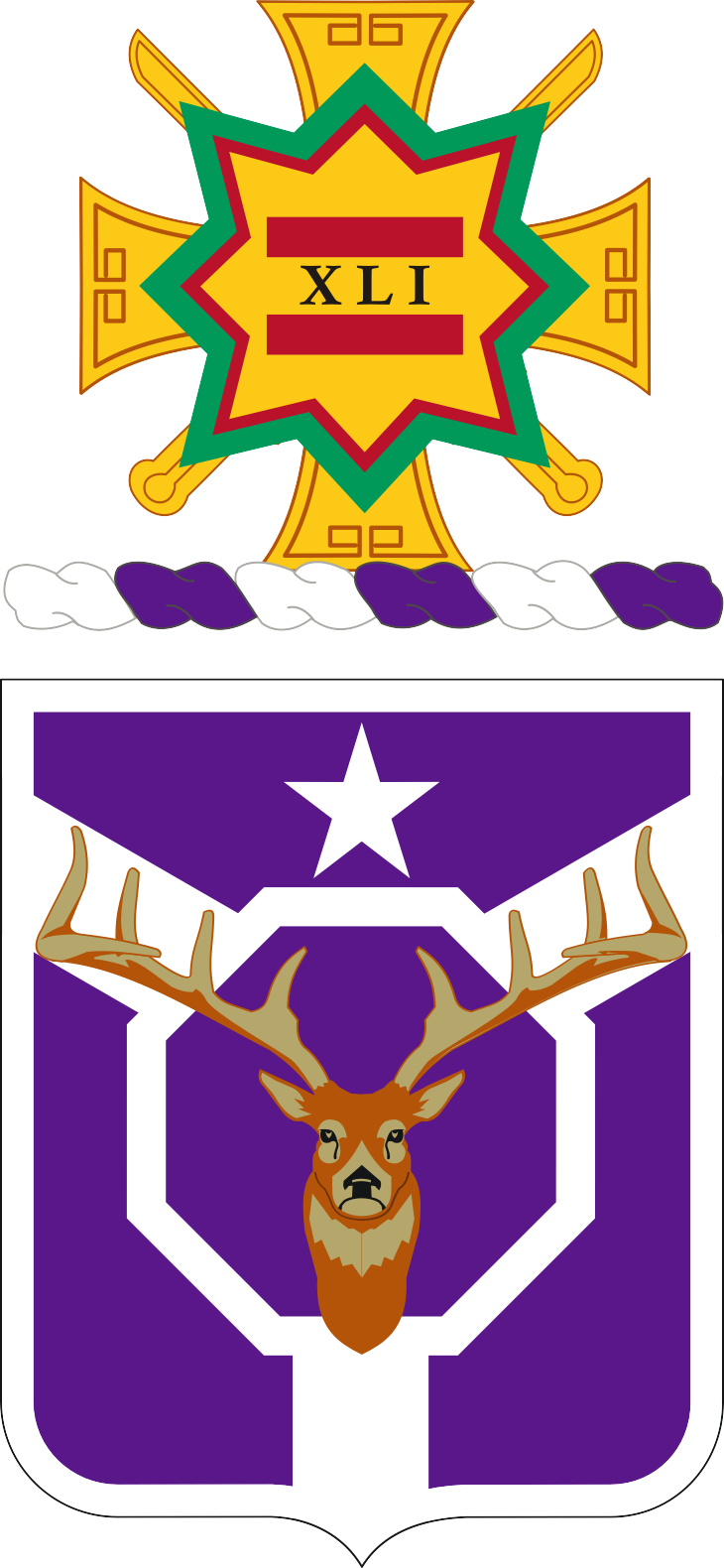
83rd Civil Affairs Battalion
"Order and Balance"

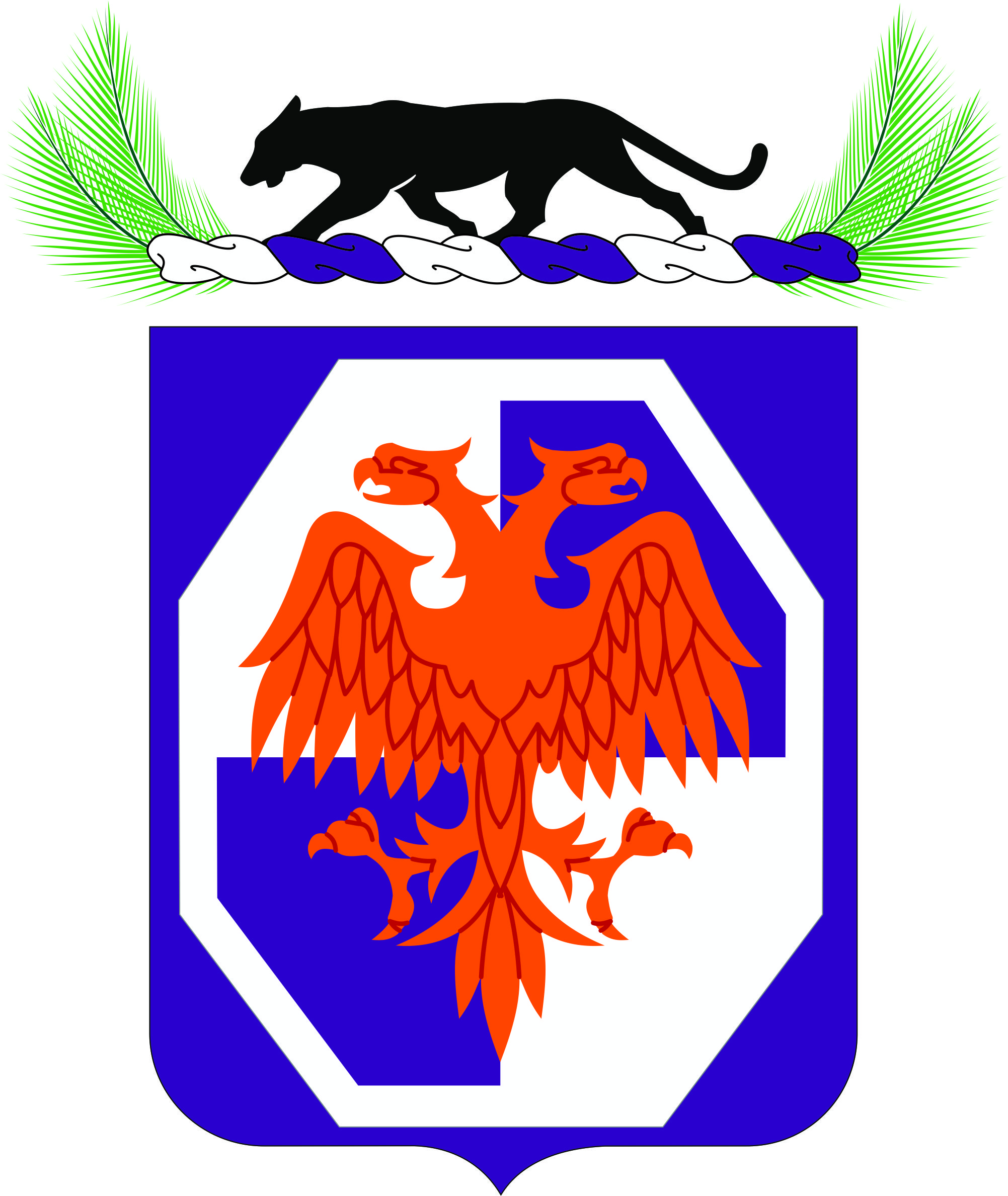
84th Civil Affairs Battalion
"De Luce Ac Umbra" (Of Light and Shadow)

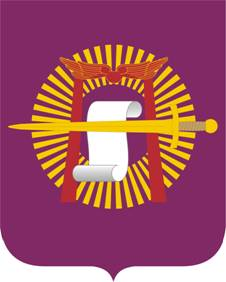
91st Civil Affairs Battalion
"Auctores Solidi Principii" (Builders of a Solid Beginning)

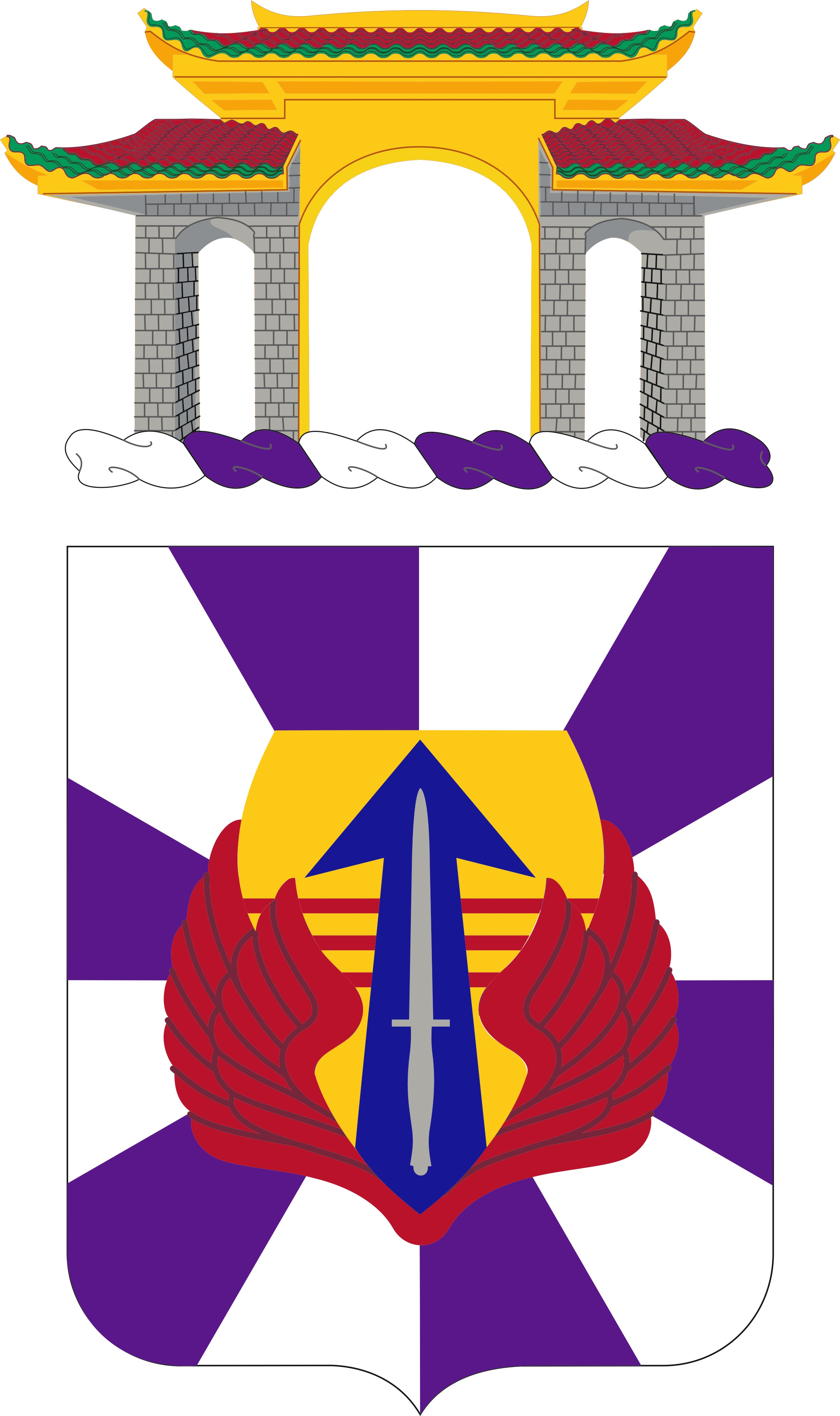
92nd Civil Affairs Battalion
"Conamen et Officium" (Commitment and Service)

96th Civil Affairs Battalion
"Advise, Maintain, Create"

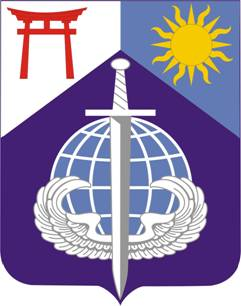
97th Civil Affairs Battalion
"Freedom Through Effects"

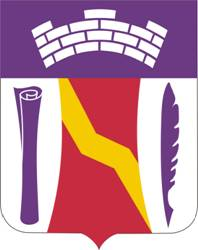
98th Civil Affairs Battalion
"The Bridge Between"

=== 400 to 500 ===
401st Civil Affairs Battalion
"Civil Military Cooperation"

402nd Civil Affairs Battalion
"Provide Order"

403rd Civil Affairs Battalion
"To Win Hearts and Minds"

404th Civil Affairs Battalion
"Safeguard the Future"

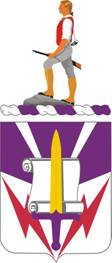
405th Civil Affairs Battalion
"Secure, Serve, Stabilize"

406th Civil Affairs Battalion
"Results Through Teamwork"

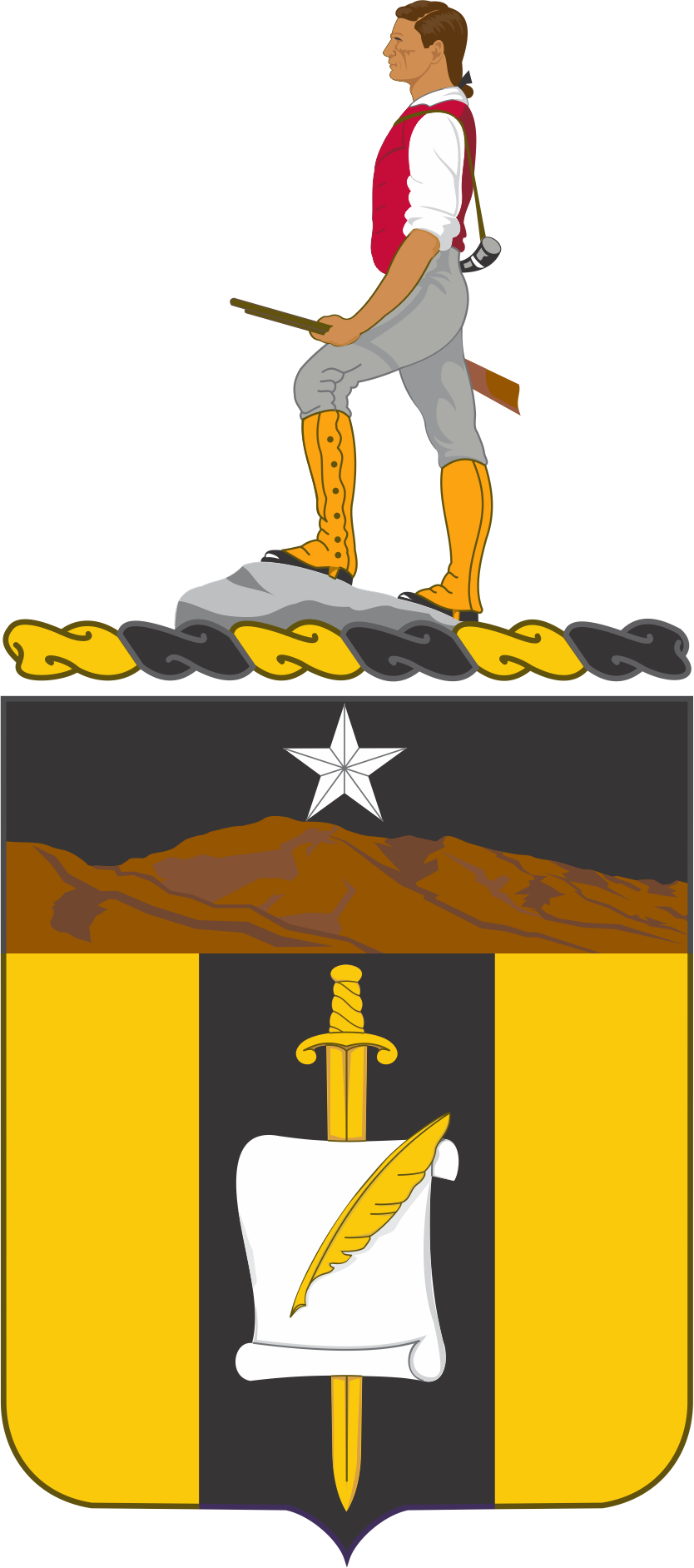
410th Civil Affairs Battalion
"Ordo ab Chao" (Out of Chaos Comes Order)

411th Civil Affairs Battalion
"Assistance, Victory, Peace"

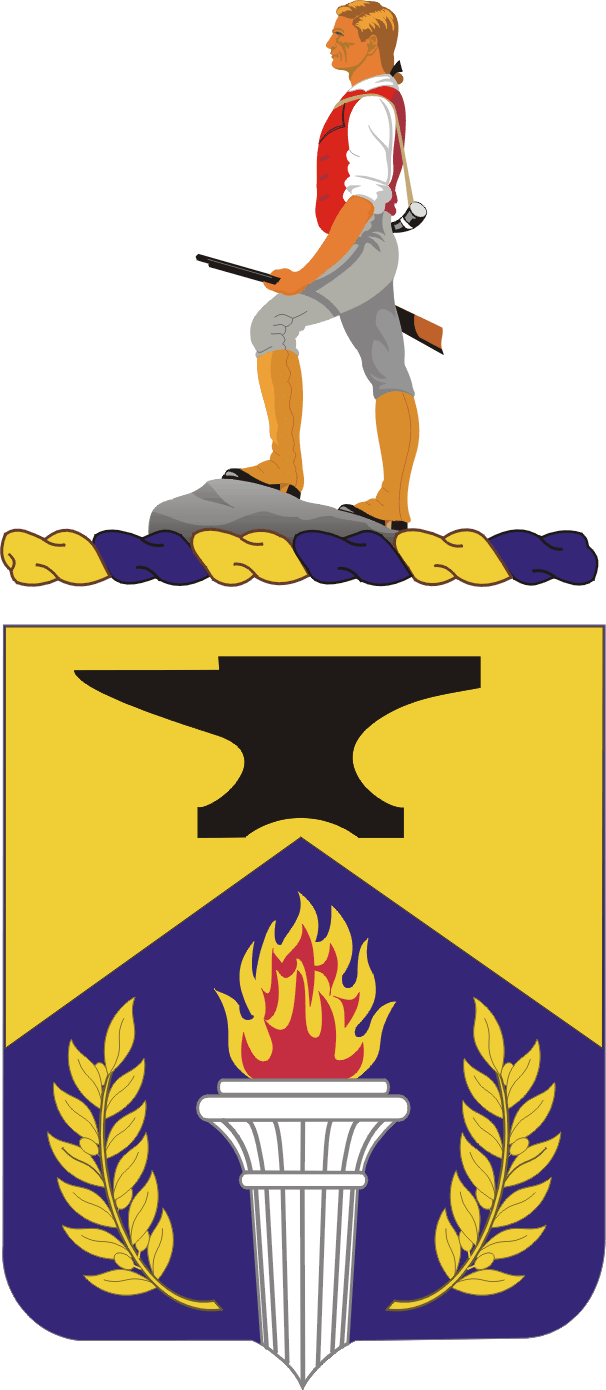
412th Civil Affairs Battalion
"Forging Peace"

413th Civil Affairs Battalion
"Peace Through Humanity"

414th Civil Affairs Battalion
"Liaison to the World"

416th Civil Affairs Battalion
"Advocatus Humanitatis" (Defender of Humanity)

418th Civil Affairs Battalion
"Proud, Ready"

422nd Civil Affairs Battalion
"Advise, Provide, Lead"

425th Civil Affairs Battalion
"Win the Peace"

426th Civil Affairs Battalion
"Exceeding the Standard"

431st Civil Affairs Battalion
"Making Order Out of Chaos"

432nd Civil Affairs Battalion
"Bringing Order to Chaos"

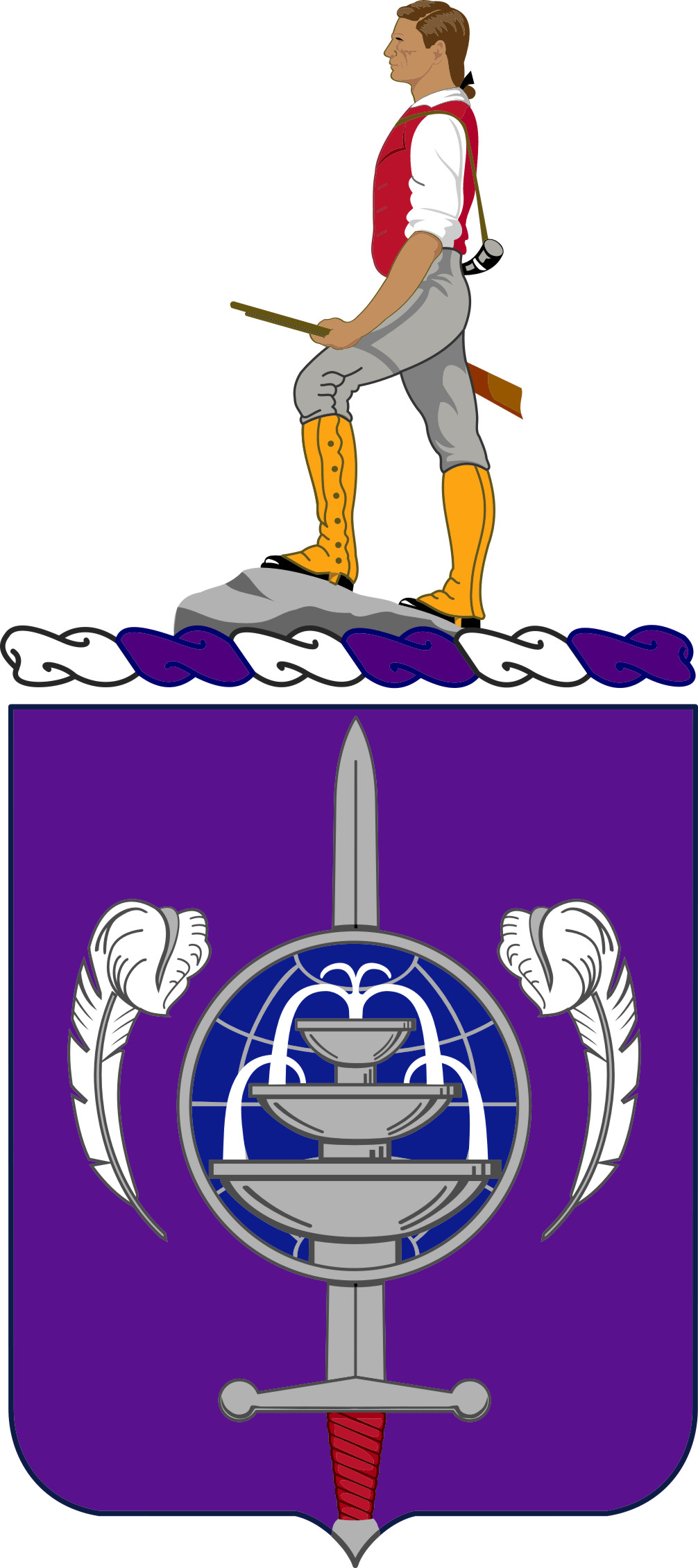
436th Civil Affairs Battalion
"Liberty through Civility"

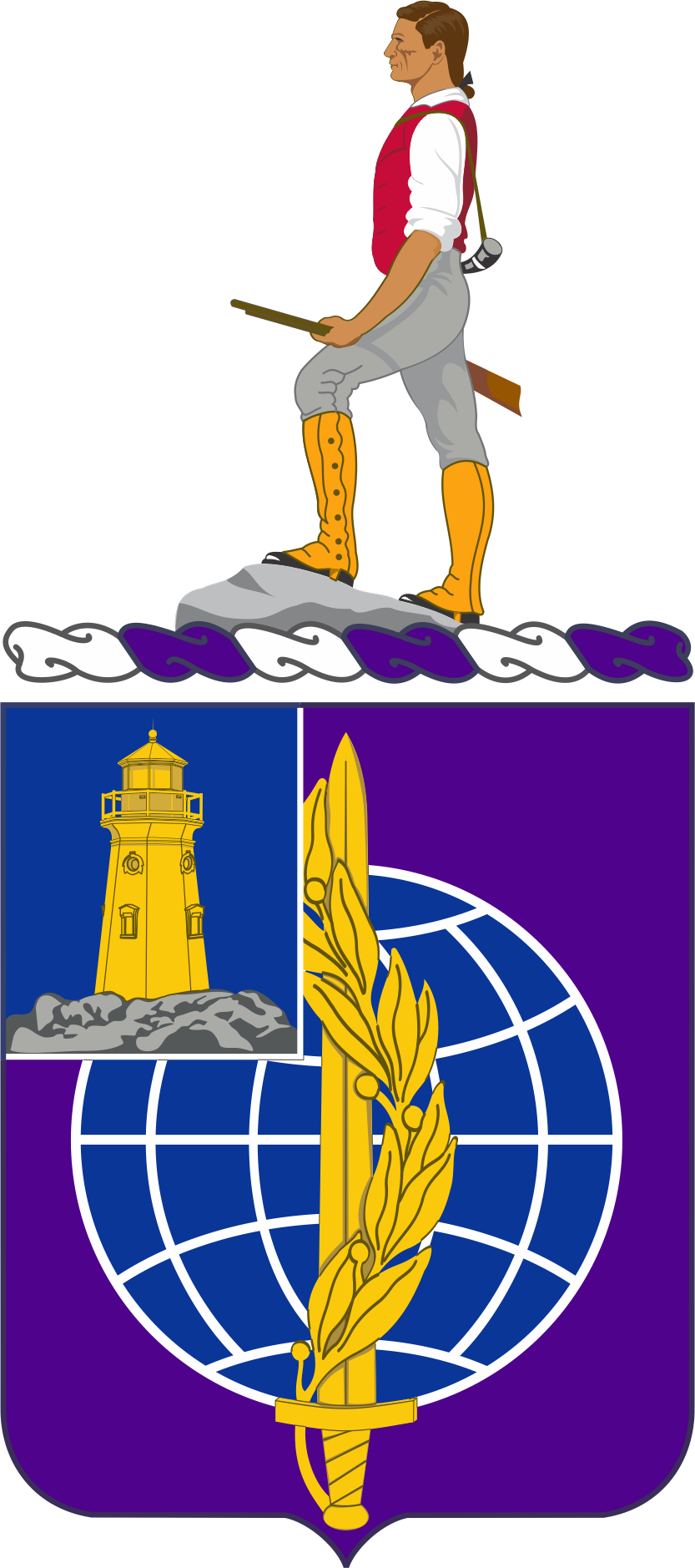
437th Civil Affairs Battalion
"Peace Through Stability"

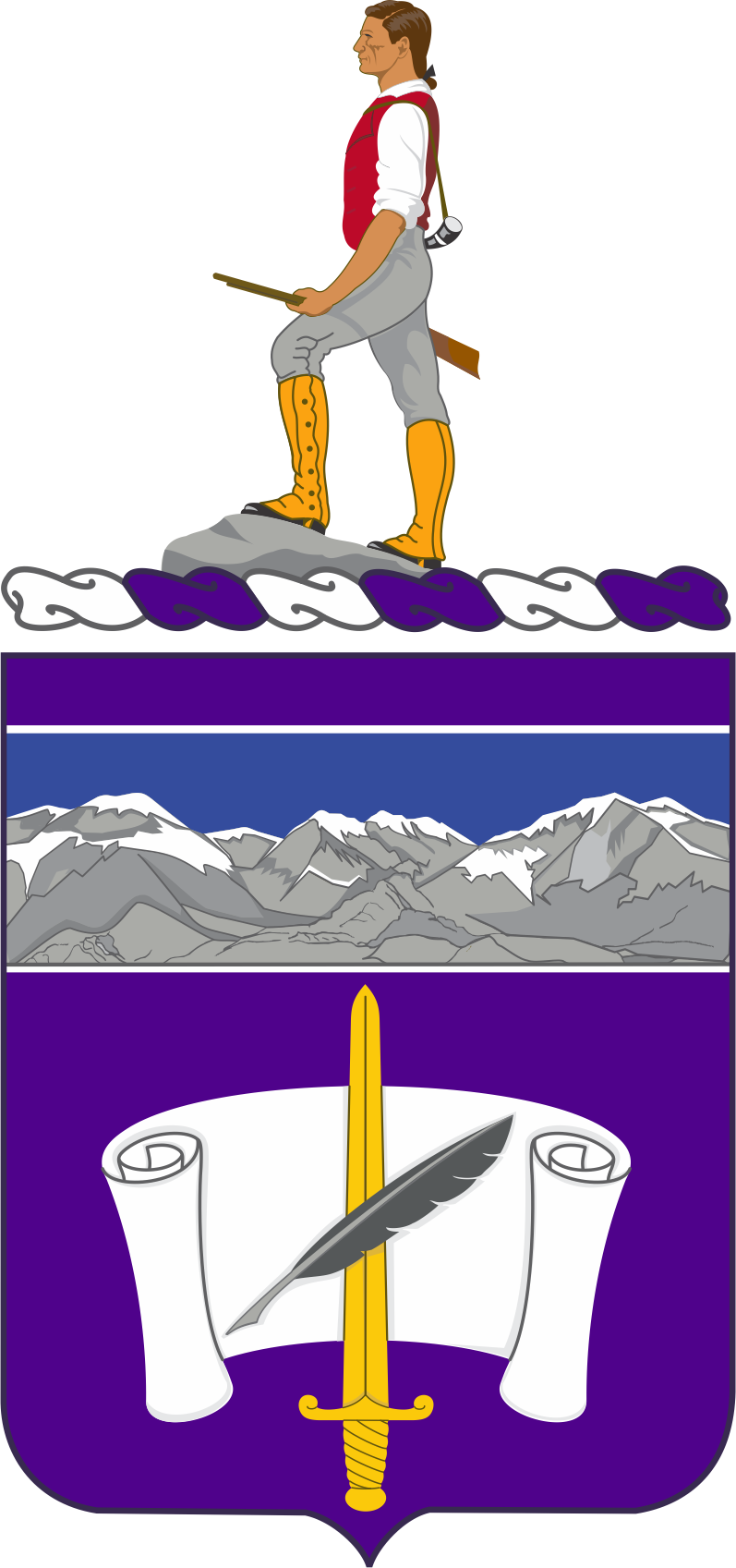
440th Civil Affairs Battalion
"Aut Viam Inveniam Aut Faciam" (I'll Either Find a Way or Make One)

443rd Civil Affairs Battalion
"Coordination for Success"

445th Civil Affairs Battalion
"Pacific Peacemaker"

450th Civil Affairs Battalion
"Peace or War, Calm or Storm"

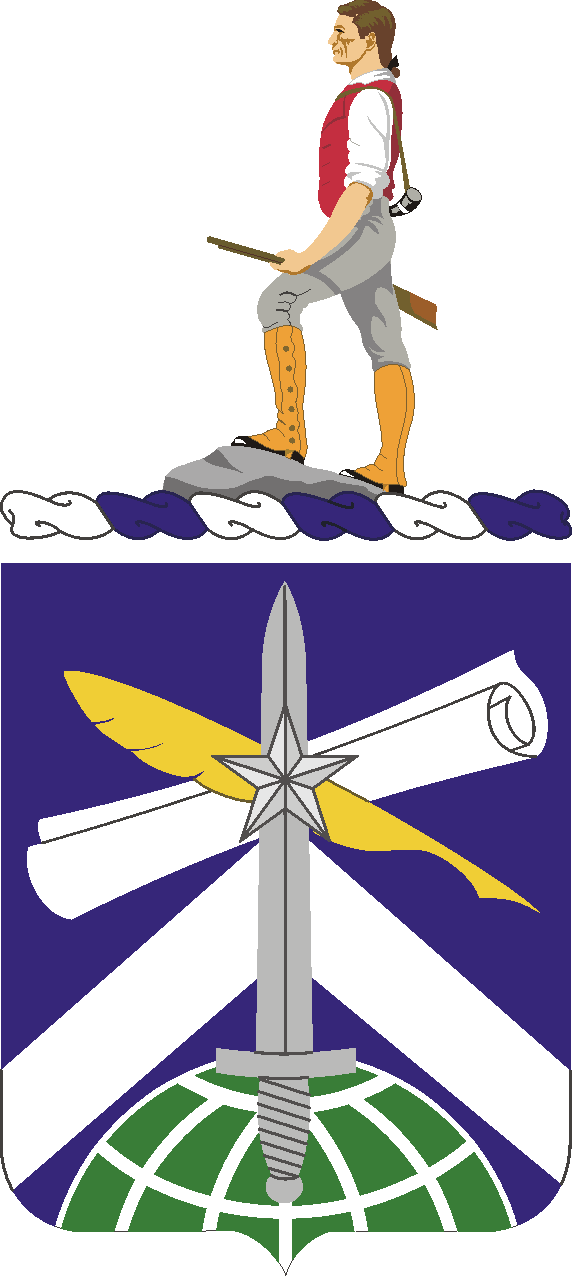
451st Civil Affairs Battalion
"Promoters of Victory"

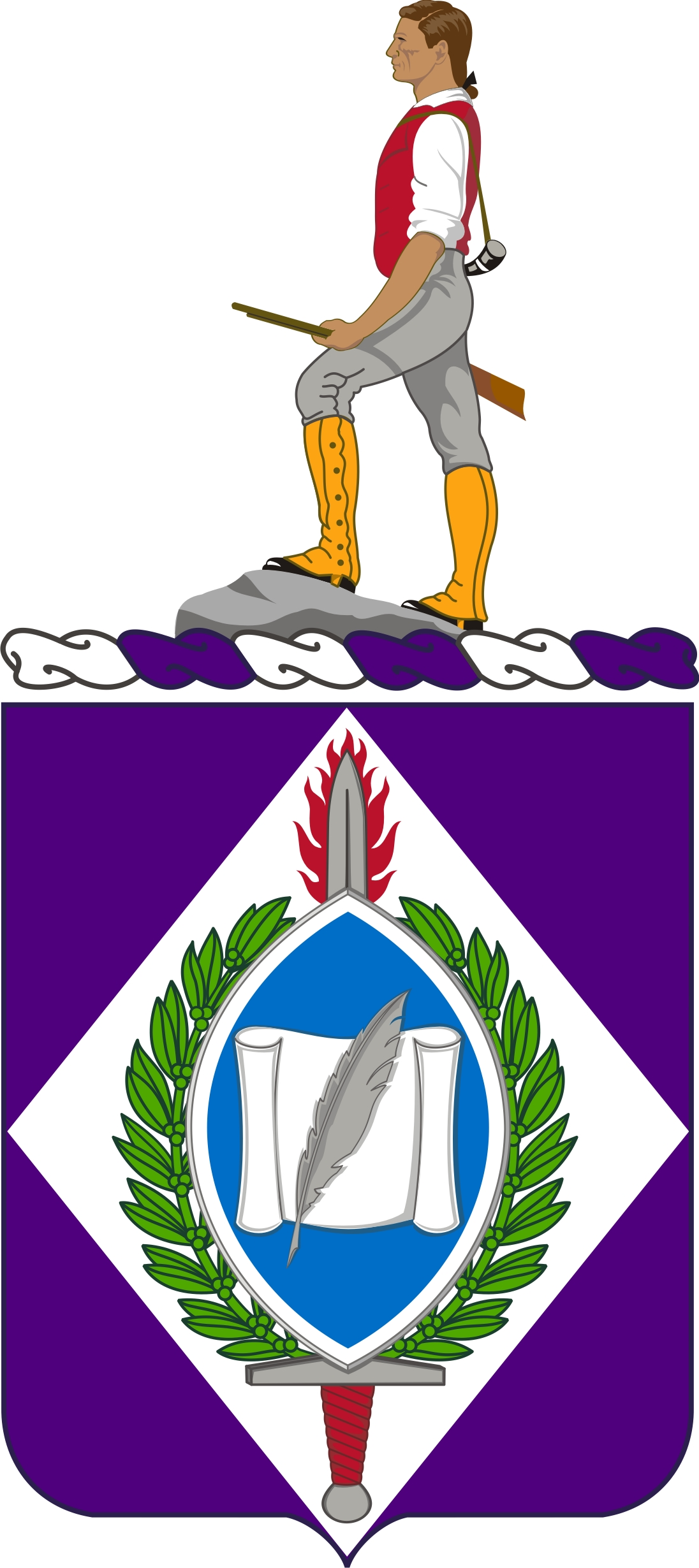
457th Civil Affairs Battalion
"Peace Through Knowledge"

478th Civil Affairs Battalion
"Supporting the Victory"

486th Civil Affairs Battalion
"Force Multiplier"

489th Civil Affairs Battalion
"Vis Amplificans Vim" (Force Amplifying Force)

490th Civil Affairs Battalion
"Progress through Unity"

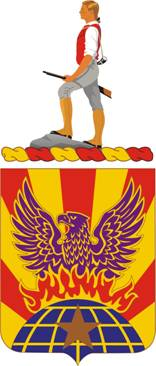
492nd Civil Affairs Battalion
"Hope through Deeds"

== Coast Artillery ==
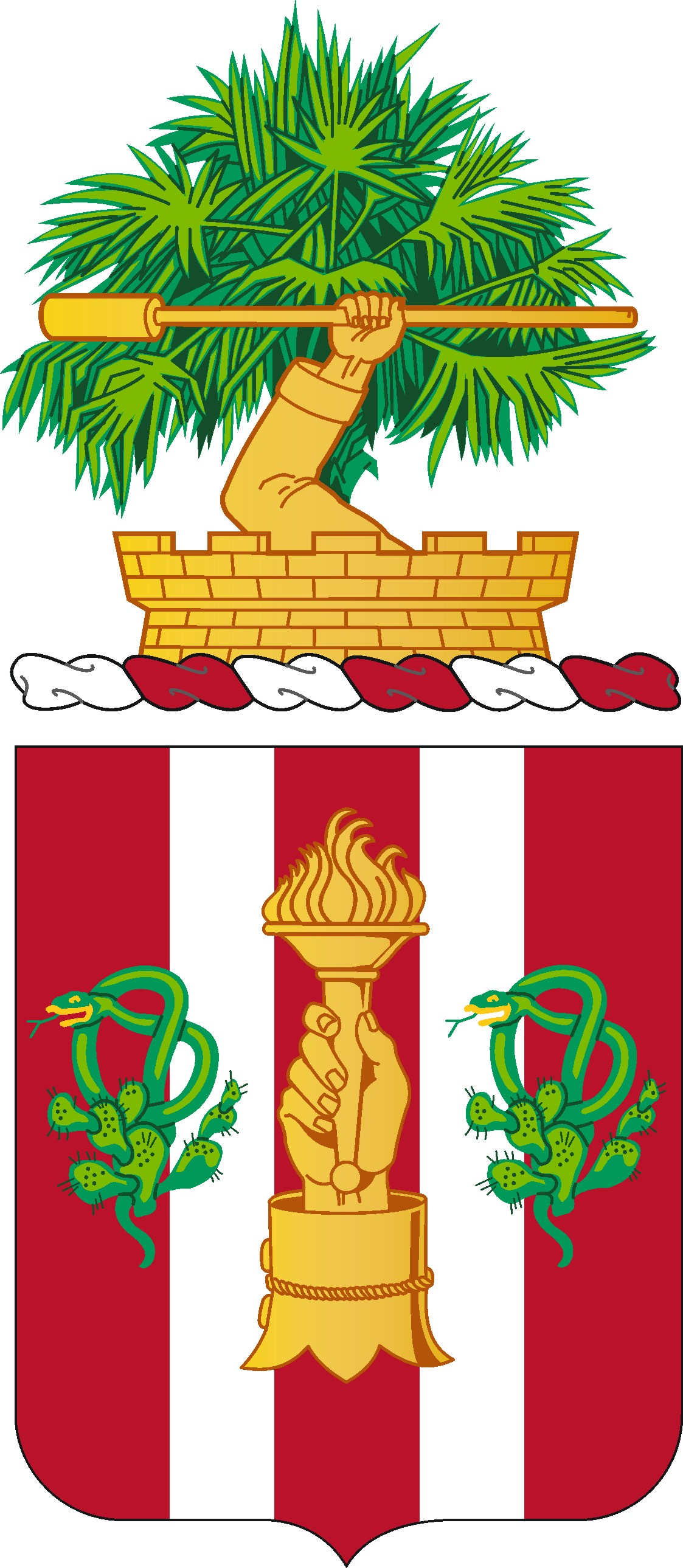
1st Coast Artillery
"Primus Inter Pares" (First among equals)"

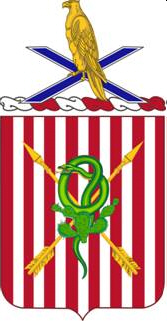
2nd Coast Artillery
"Fidus Ultra Finem (Faithful Beyond the End)"

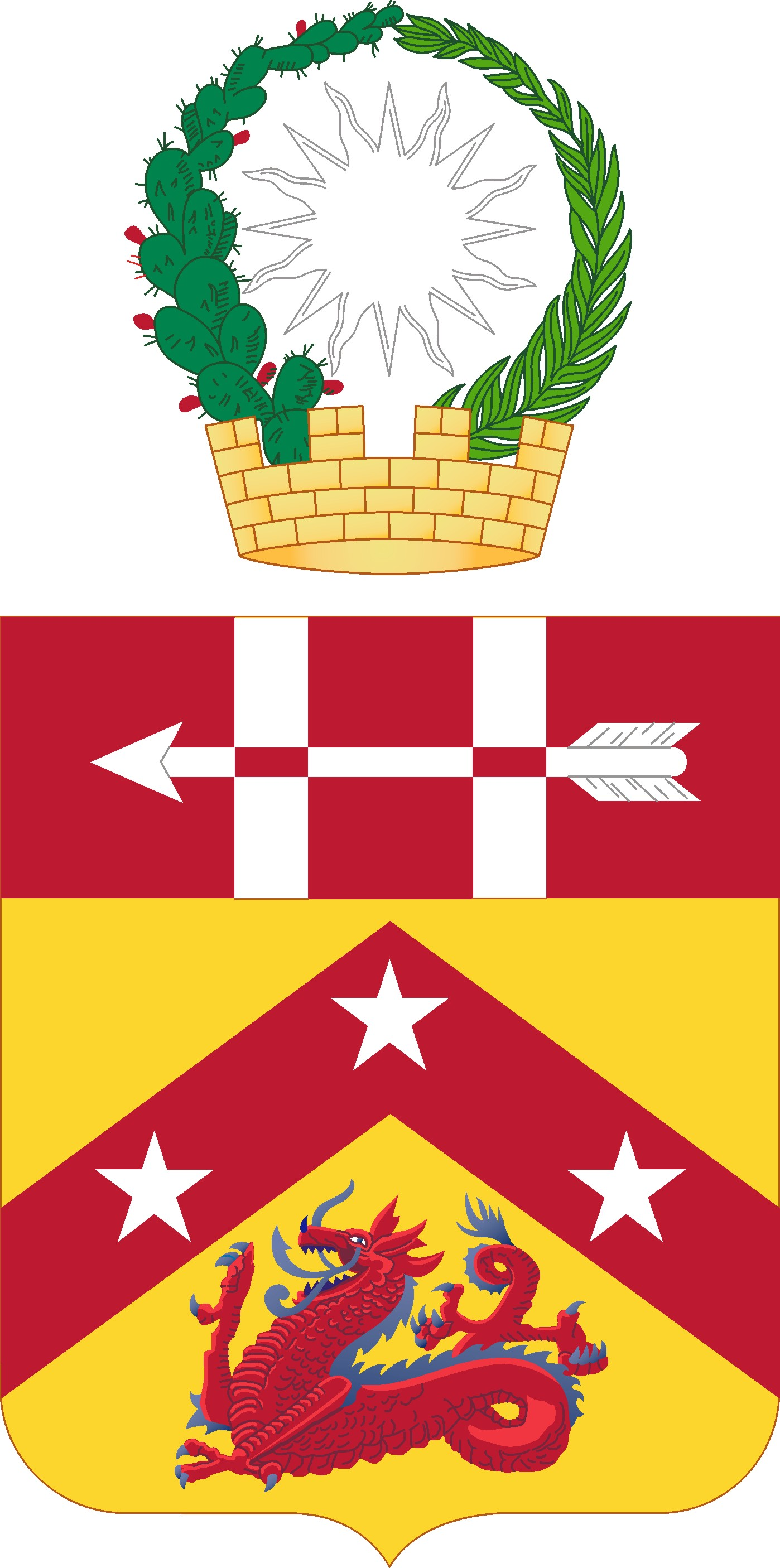
3rd Coast Artillery
"NON CEDO FERIO (yield not, strike)"

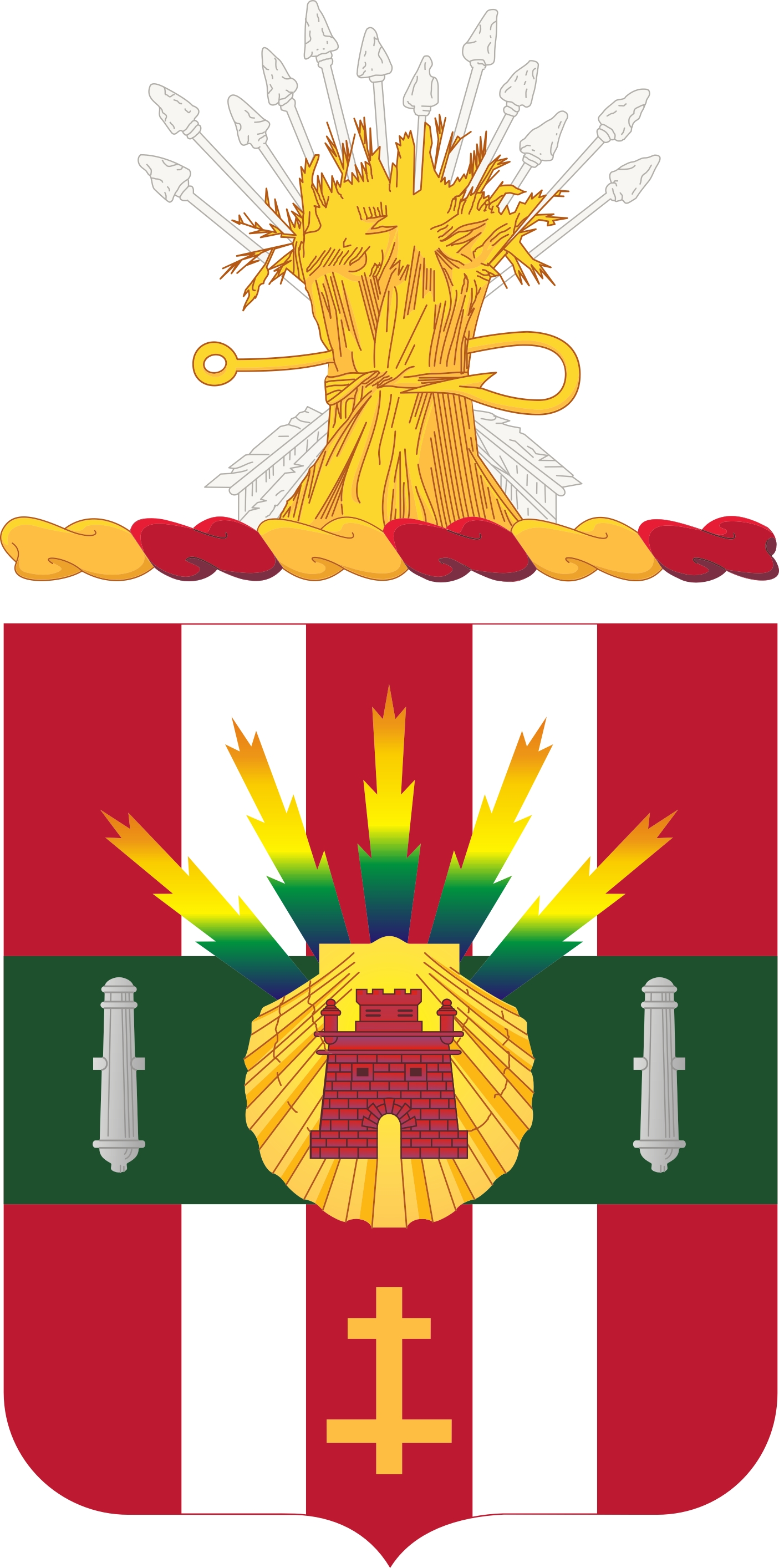
4th Coast Artillery
"Nulli Vestigia Retrorsum" (No Step Backward)"

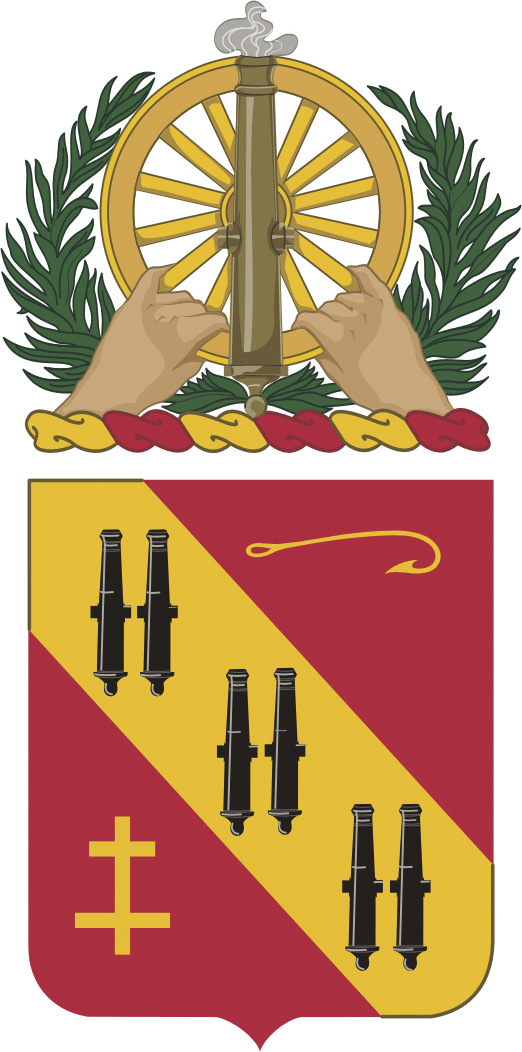
5th Coast Artillery
"Volens et Potens" (Willing and Able)."

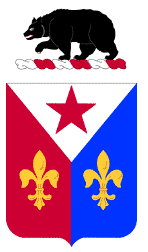
6th Coast Artillery
"Certo Dirigo Ictu" (I Aim With a Sure Blow)

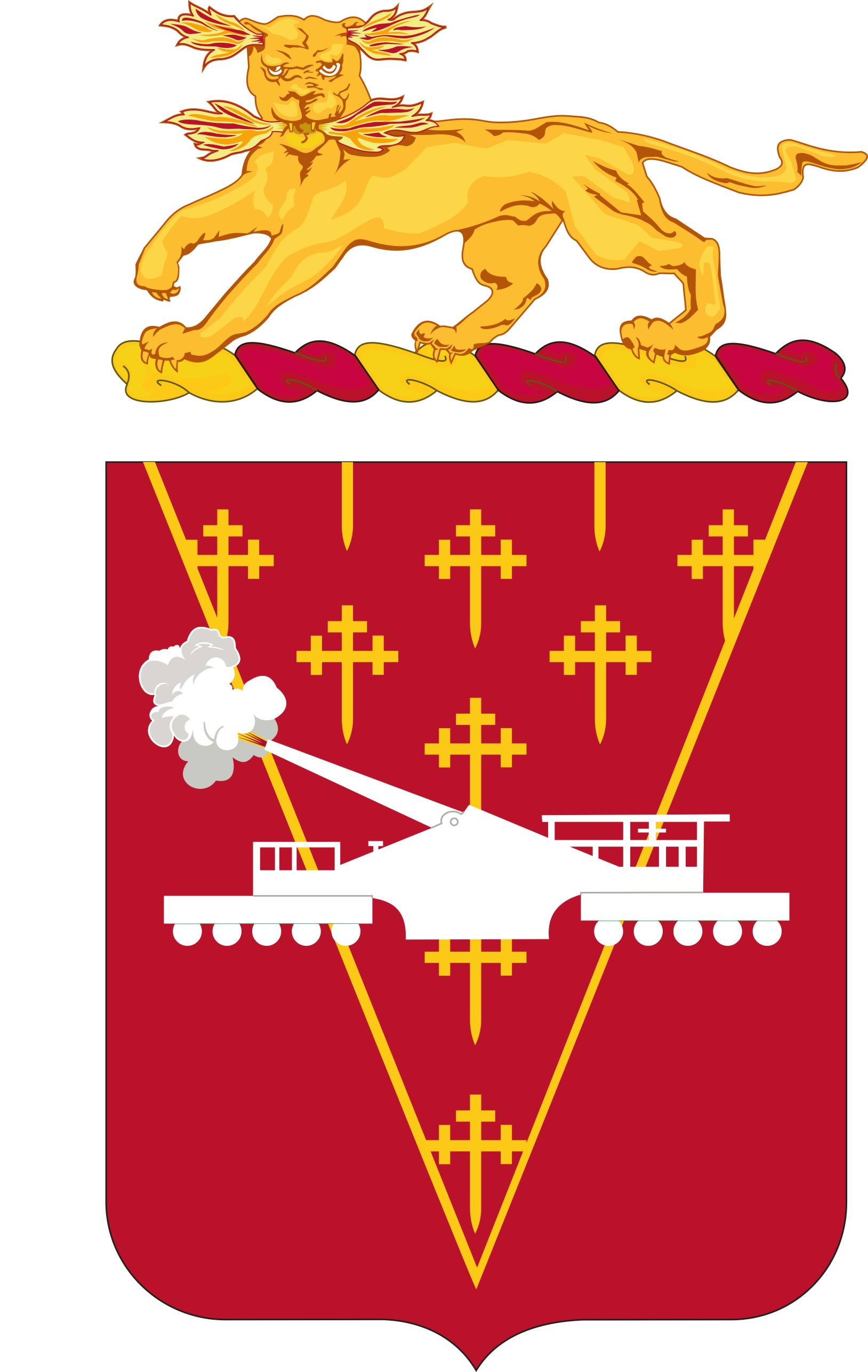
7th Coast Artillery
"Nullius Pavet Occursum (He Fears No Encounter)

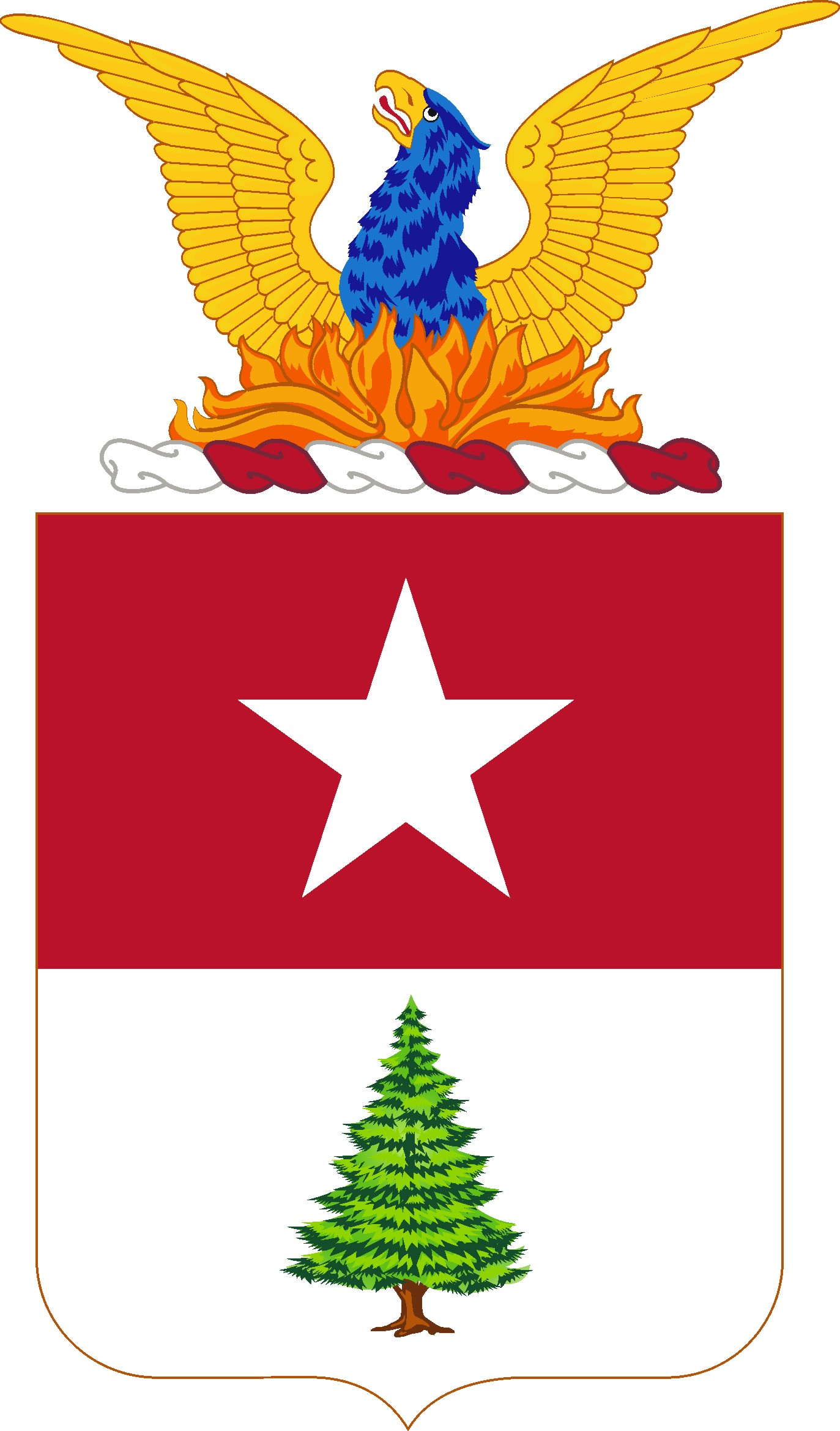
8th Coast Artillery
"Terrae Portam Defendamus" (We Defend The Land Gate)

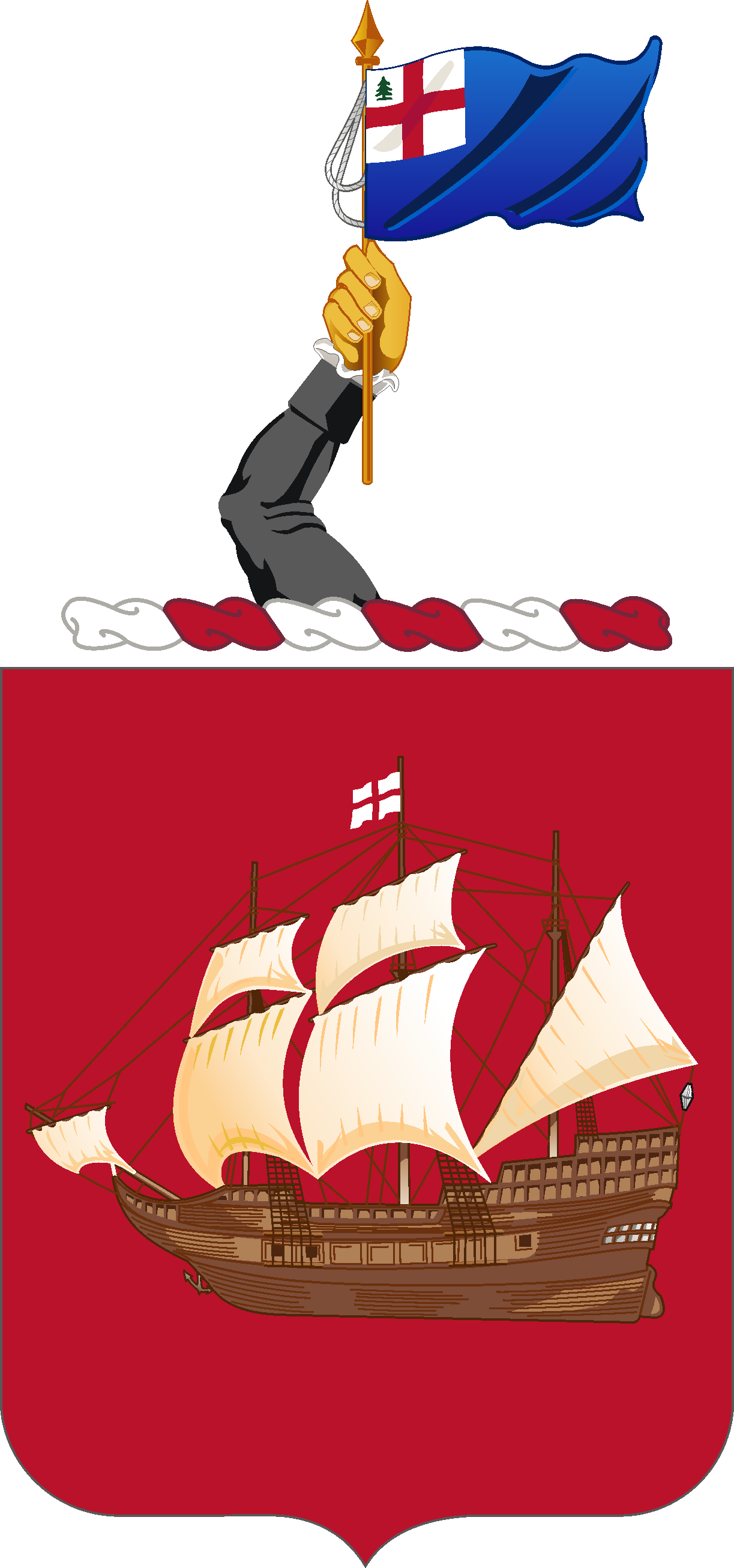
9th Coast Artillery
"Prima Libertatis Acie" (In the First Line of Battle for Liberty)

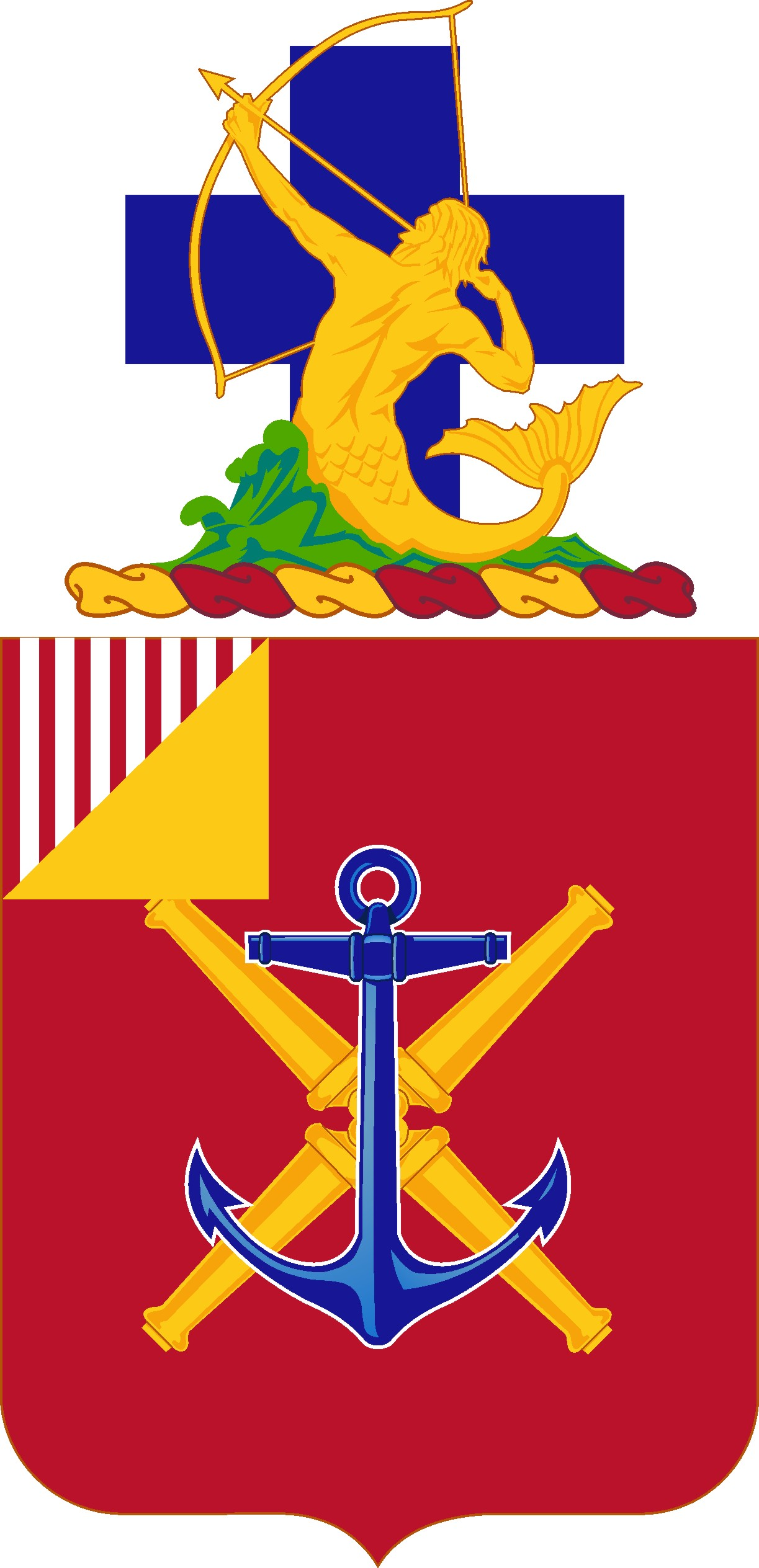
10th Coast Artillery
"Vaillant et Veillant"

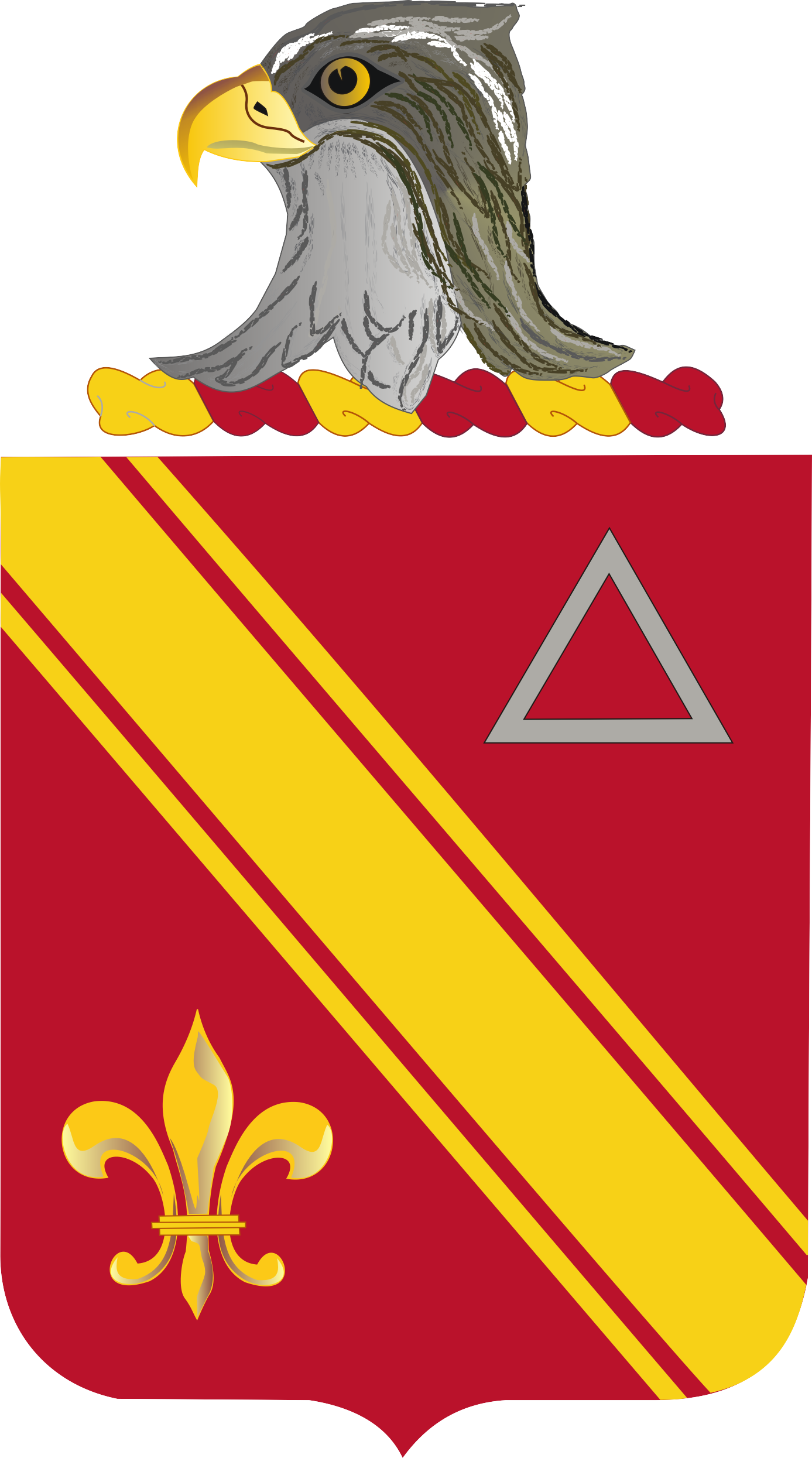
11th Coast Artillery
"Audax et Vigilans" (Daring and Vigilant)

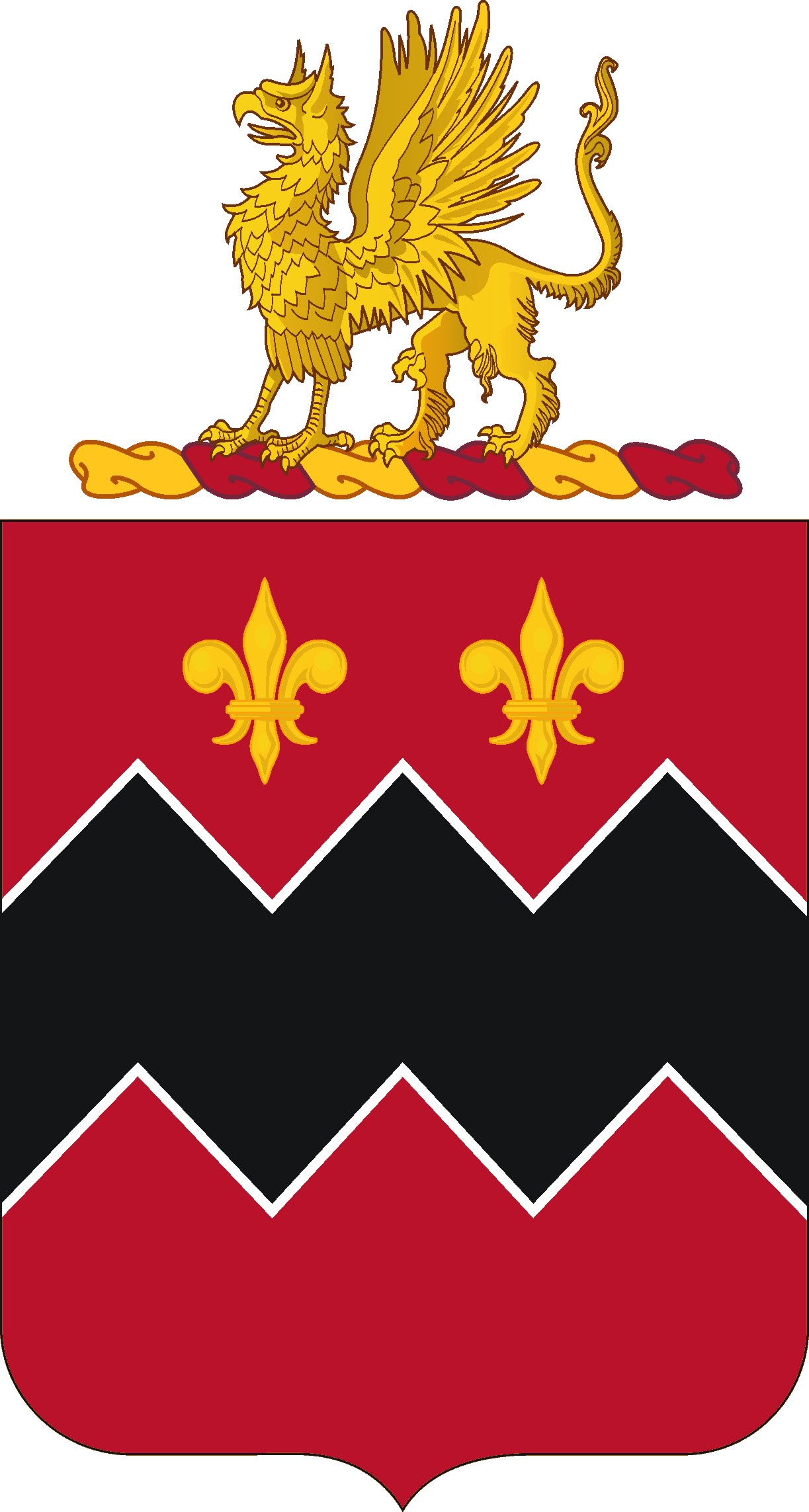
12th Coast Artillery
"Impiger et Animosus" (Alert and Courageous)

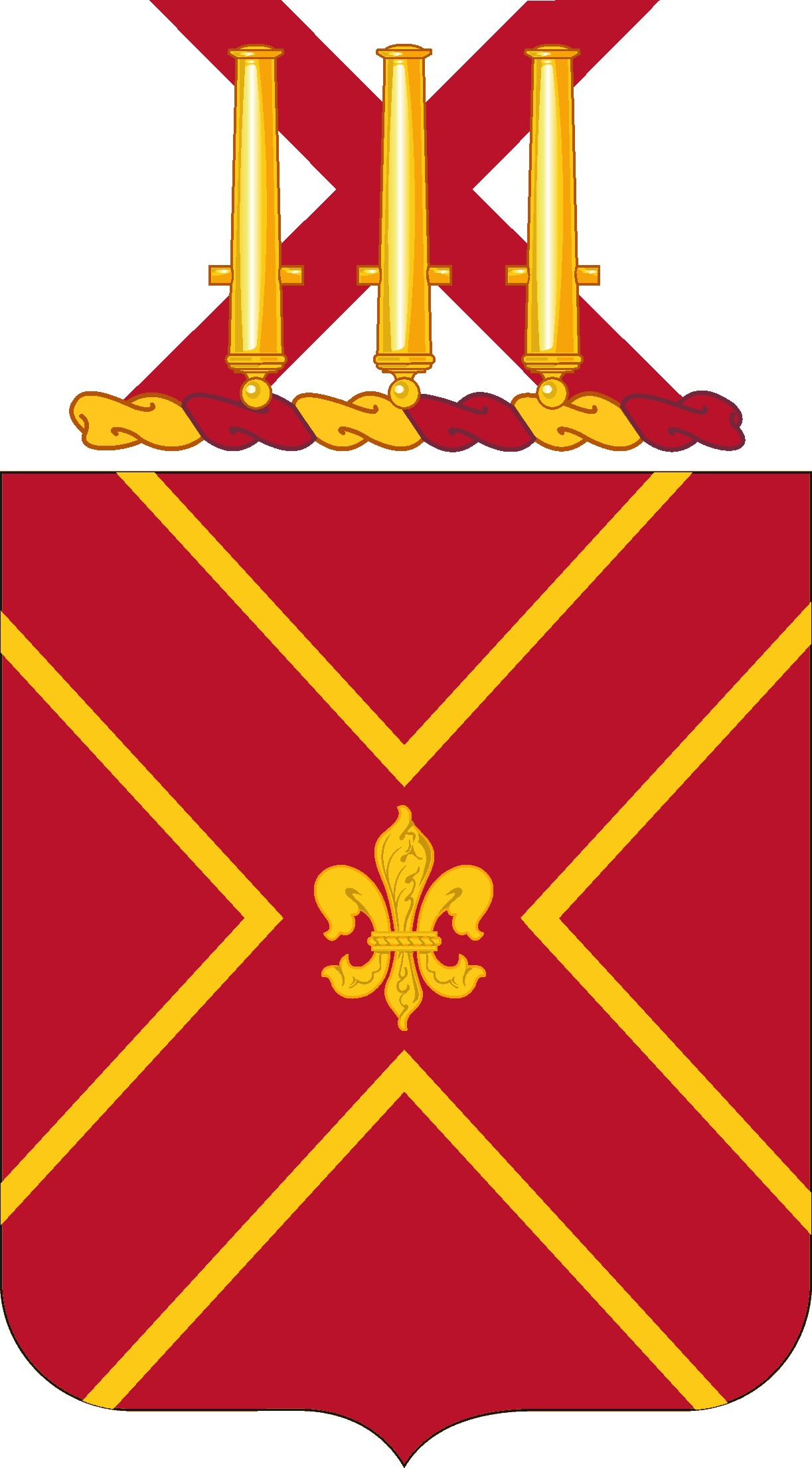
13th Coast Artillery
"Quod Habemus Defendemus" (What we Hold we will Defend)

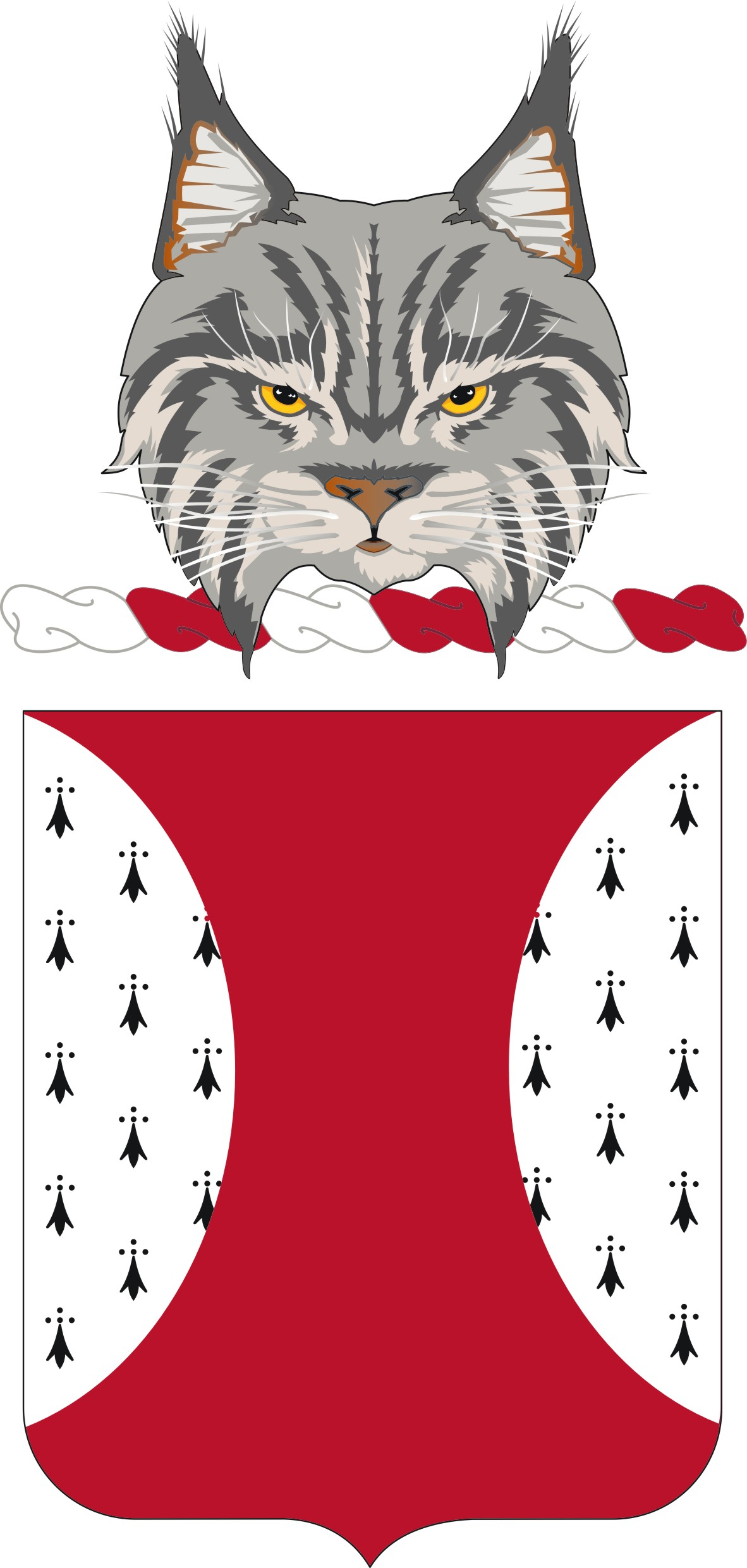
14th Coast Artillery
"Semper Vigilans"

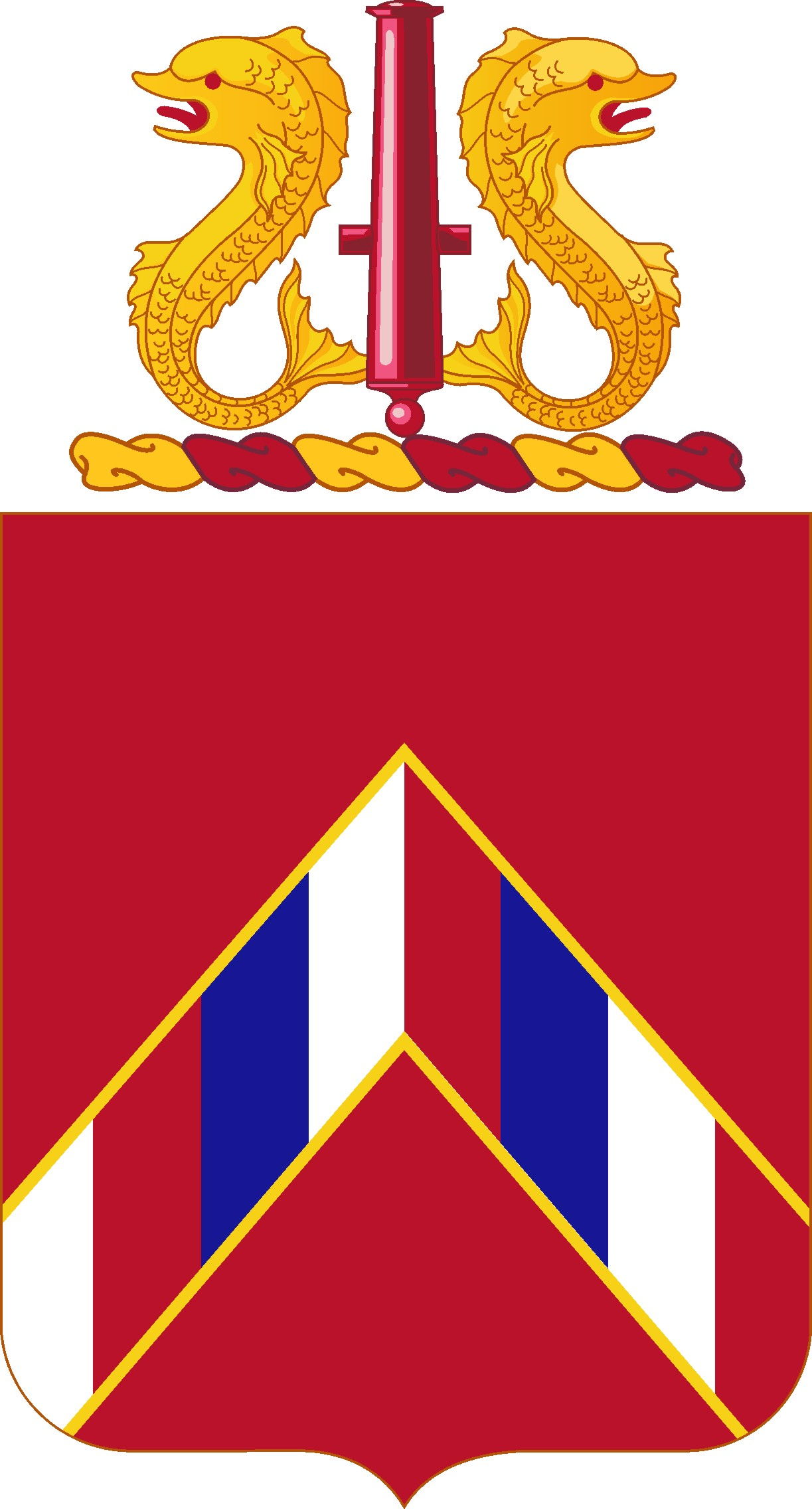
15th Coast Artillery
"Littore Sistimus" (We Take Our Stand on the Shore)

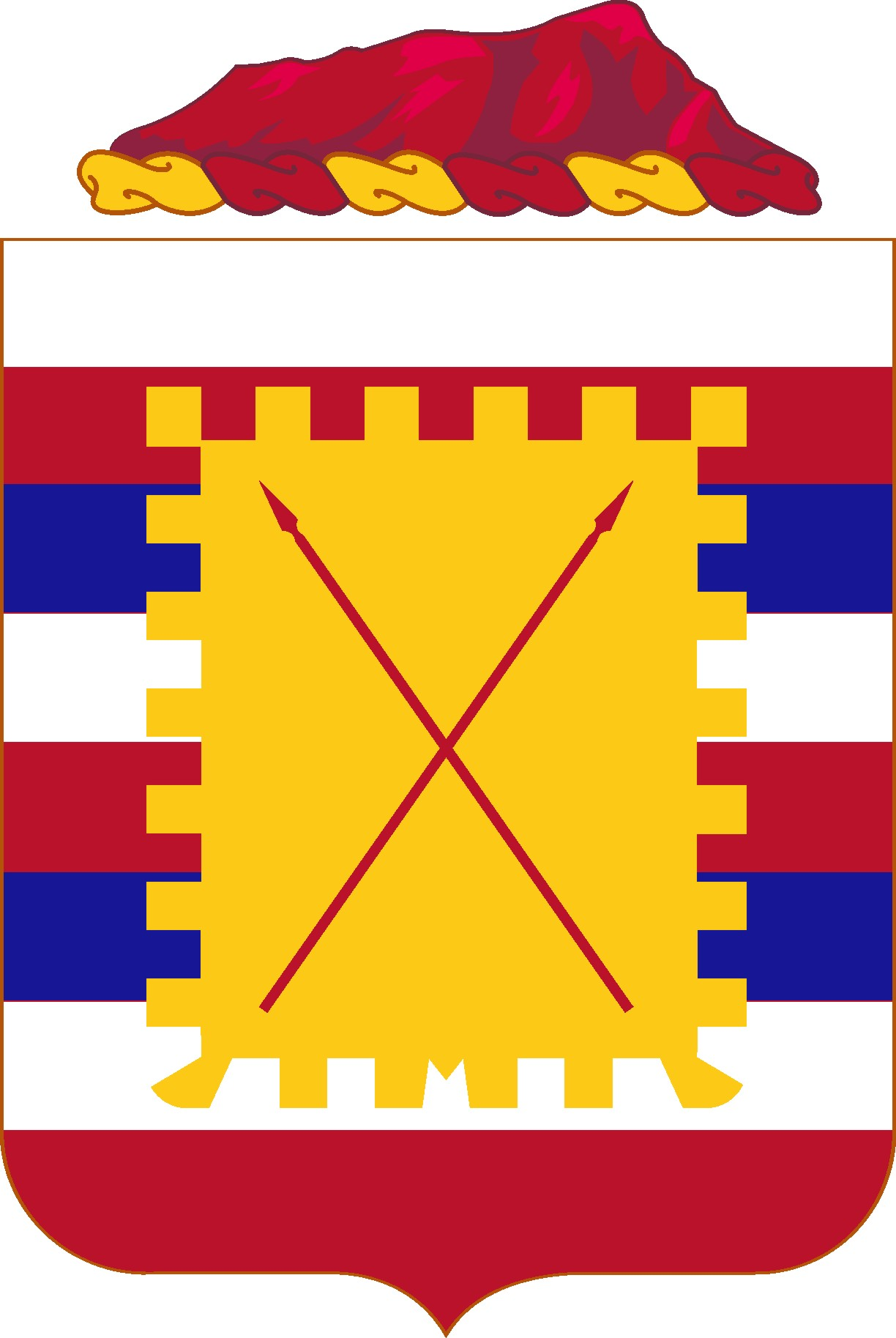
16th Coast Artillery
"KAPU (Keep out)"

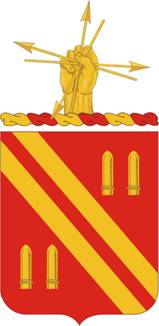
42d Coast Artillery
"FESTINA LENTE (Make Haste Slowly)"

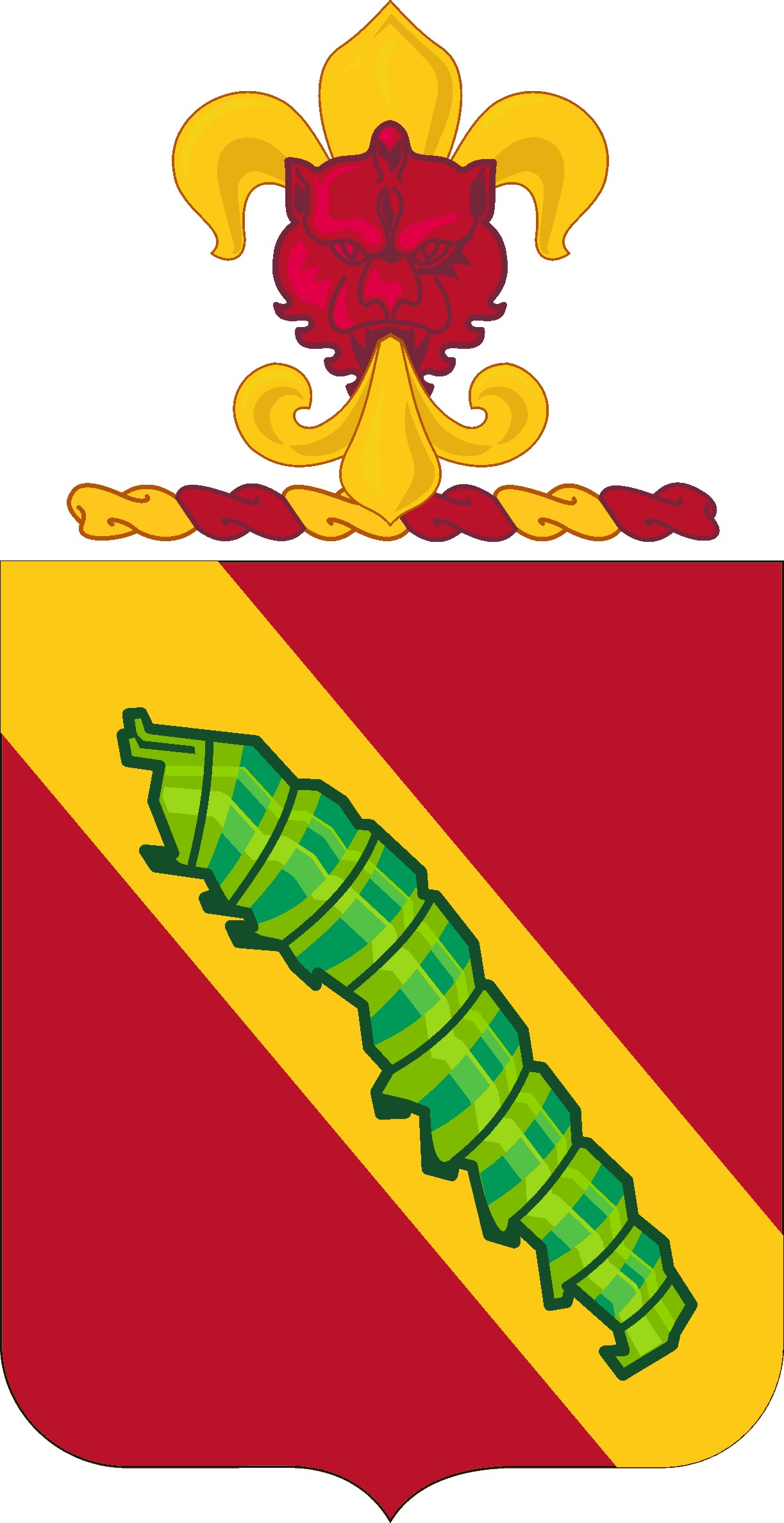
51st Coast Artillery
"En Avant" (Forward)

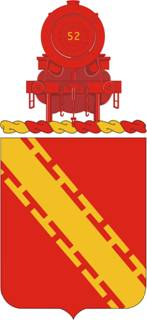
52nd Coast Artillery
"Semper Paratus" (Always Prepared)

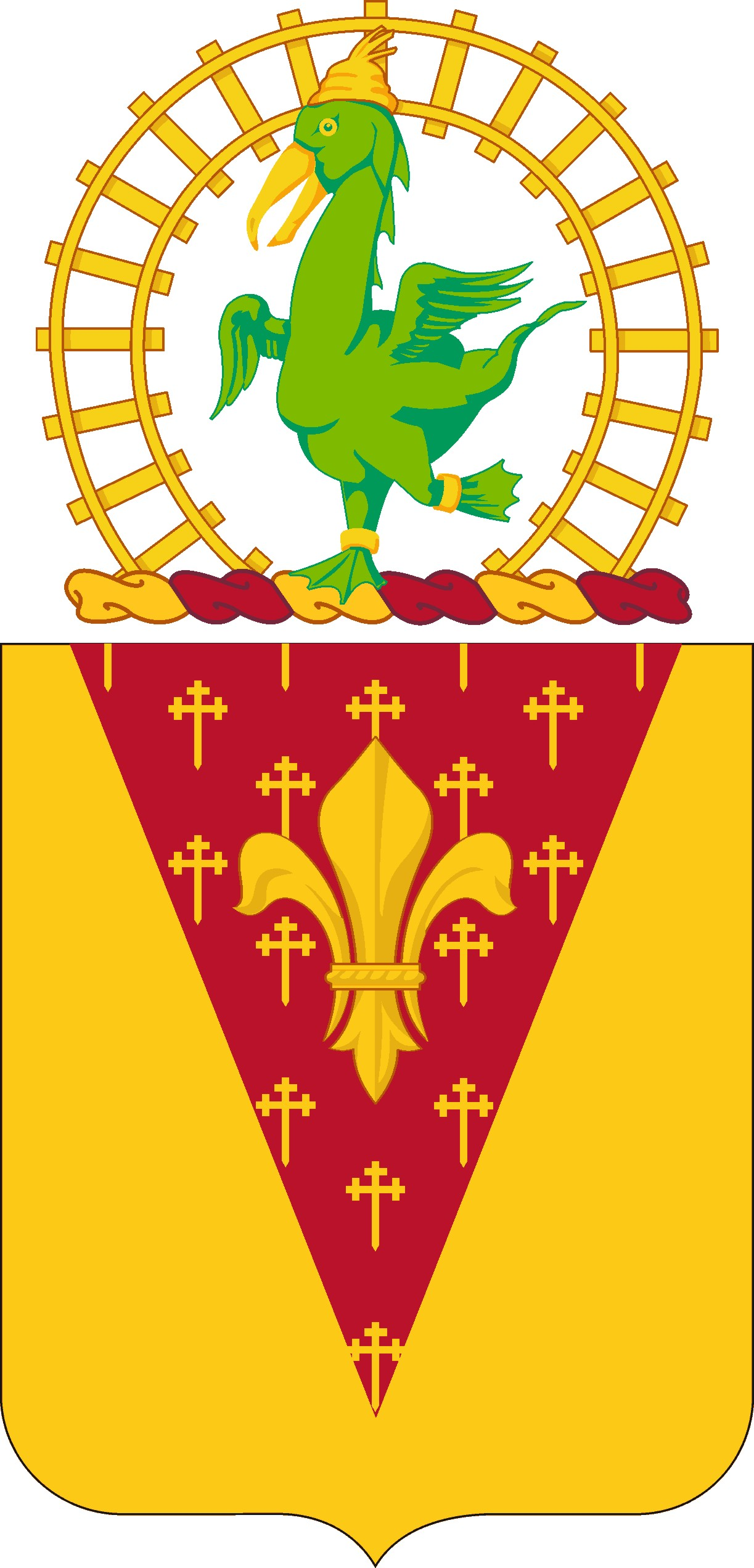
53rd Coast Artillery
"Je Frappe" (I Strike)

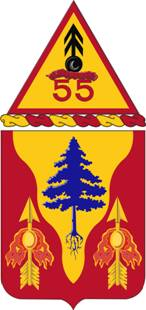
55th Coast Artillery
"VIGILANTIA (Vigilance)"

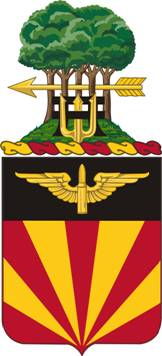
56th Coast Artillery
"Night Hides Not"

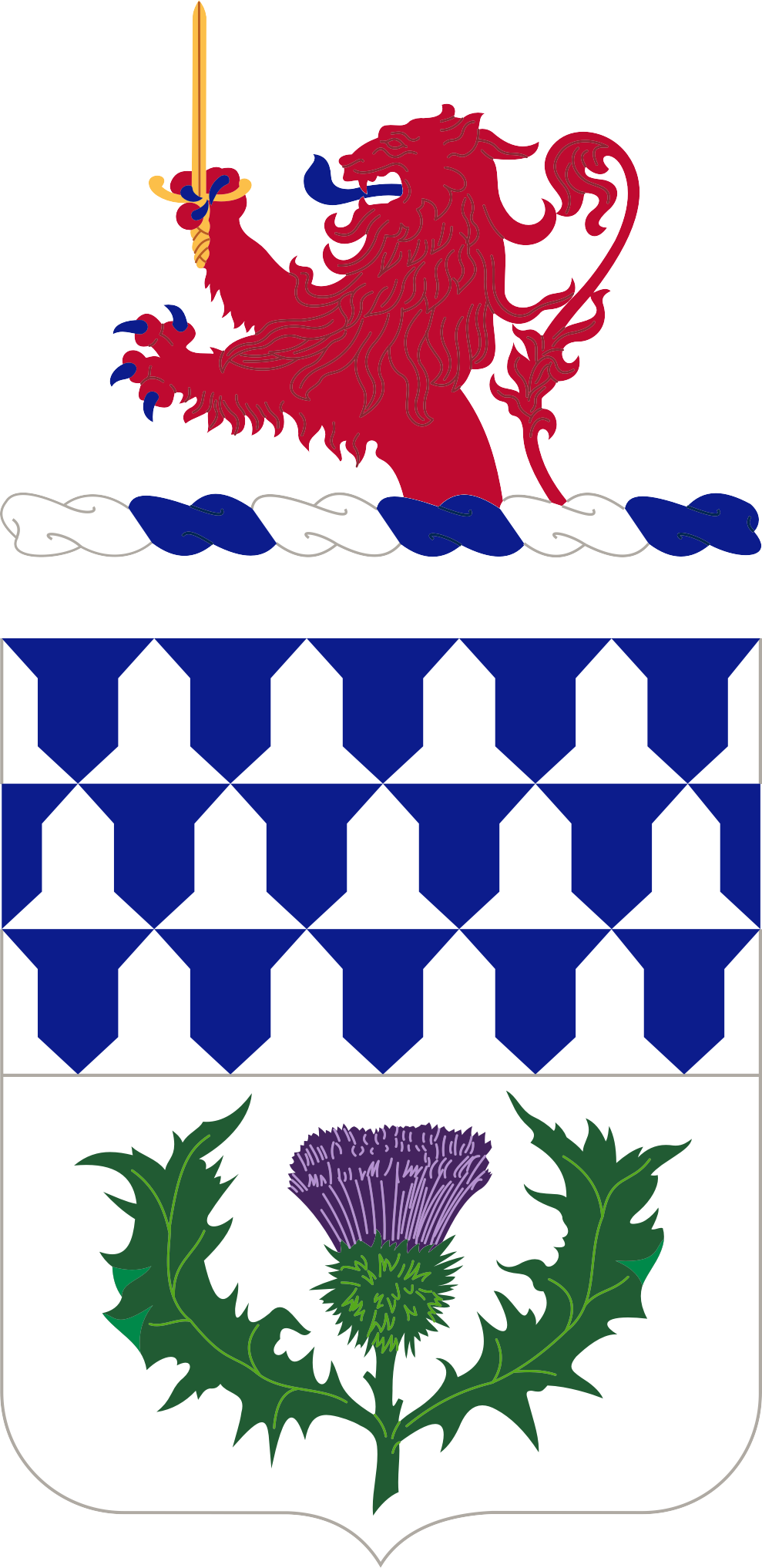
59th Coast Artillery
"Defendimus"

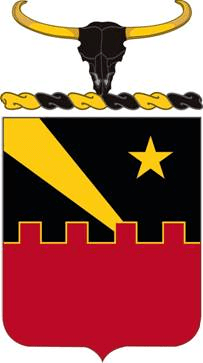
60th Coast Artillery
"Coelis Imperamus" (We Rule The Heavens)

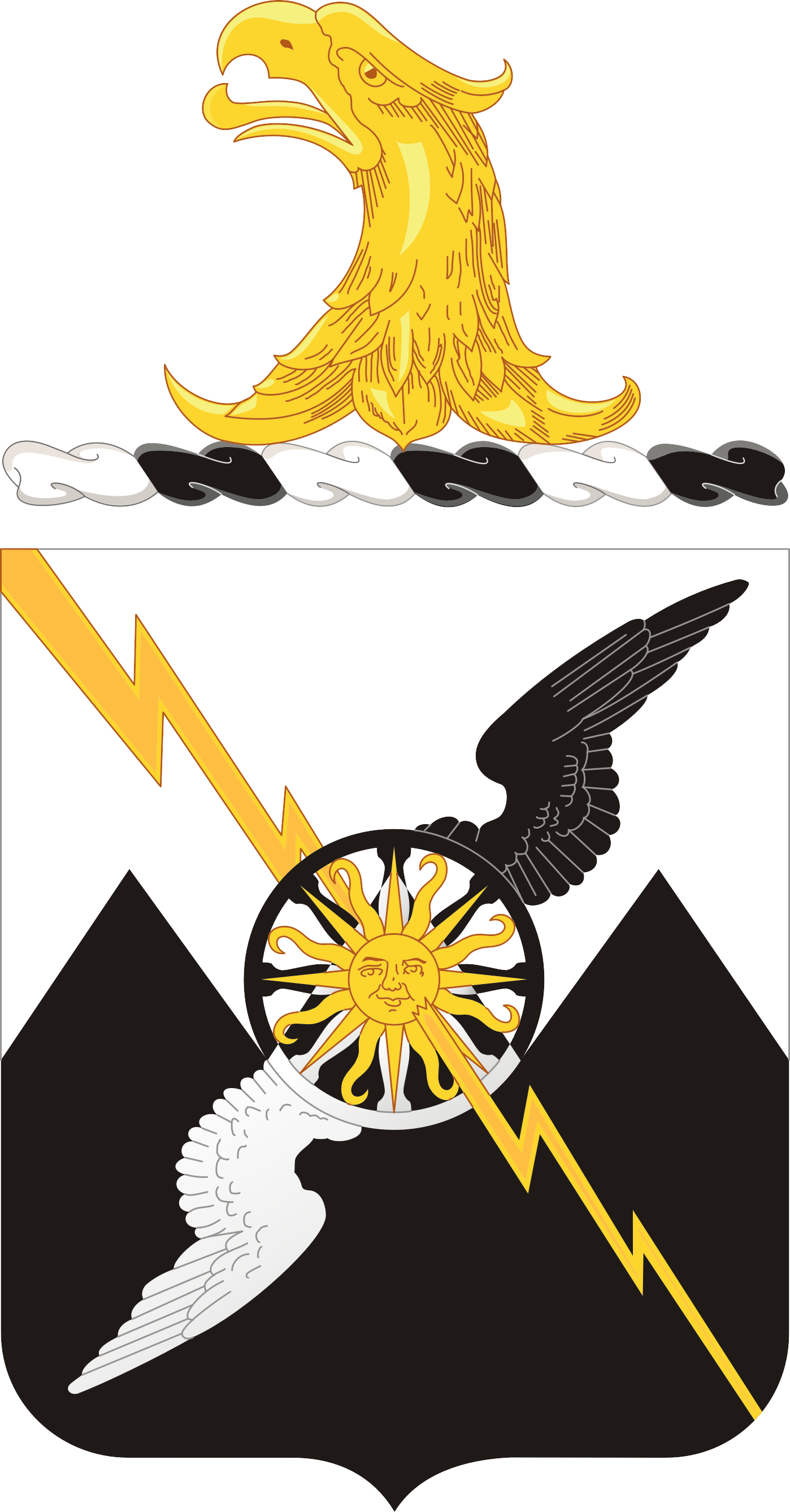
61st Coast Artillery
"Non Est Ad Astra Mollis E Terris Via" (The Way To the Stars Is Not Easy)

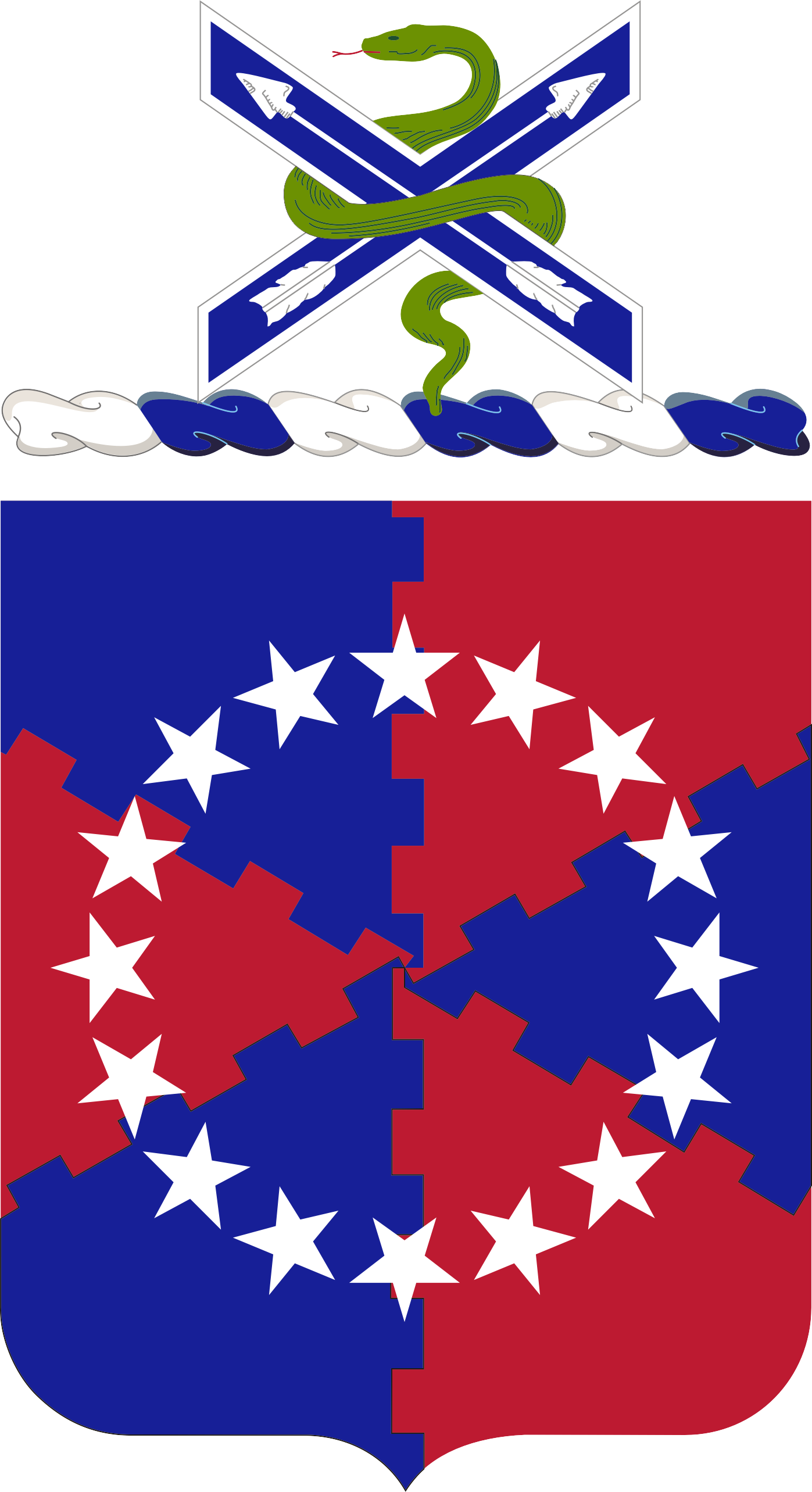
62d Coast Artillery
""Nitimur in Alta" (We Aim at High Things)

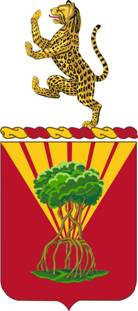
65th Coast Artillery
"Sursum" (Upwards)"

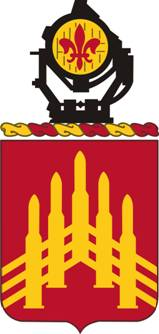
71st Coast Artillery
"Unidique Venimus" (We Come From All Parts)

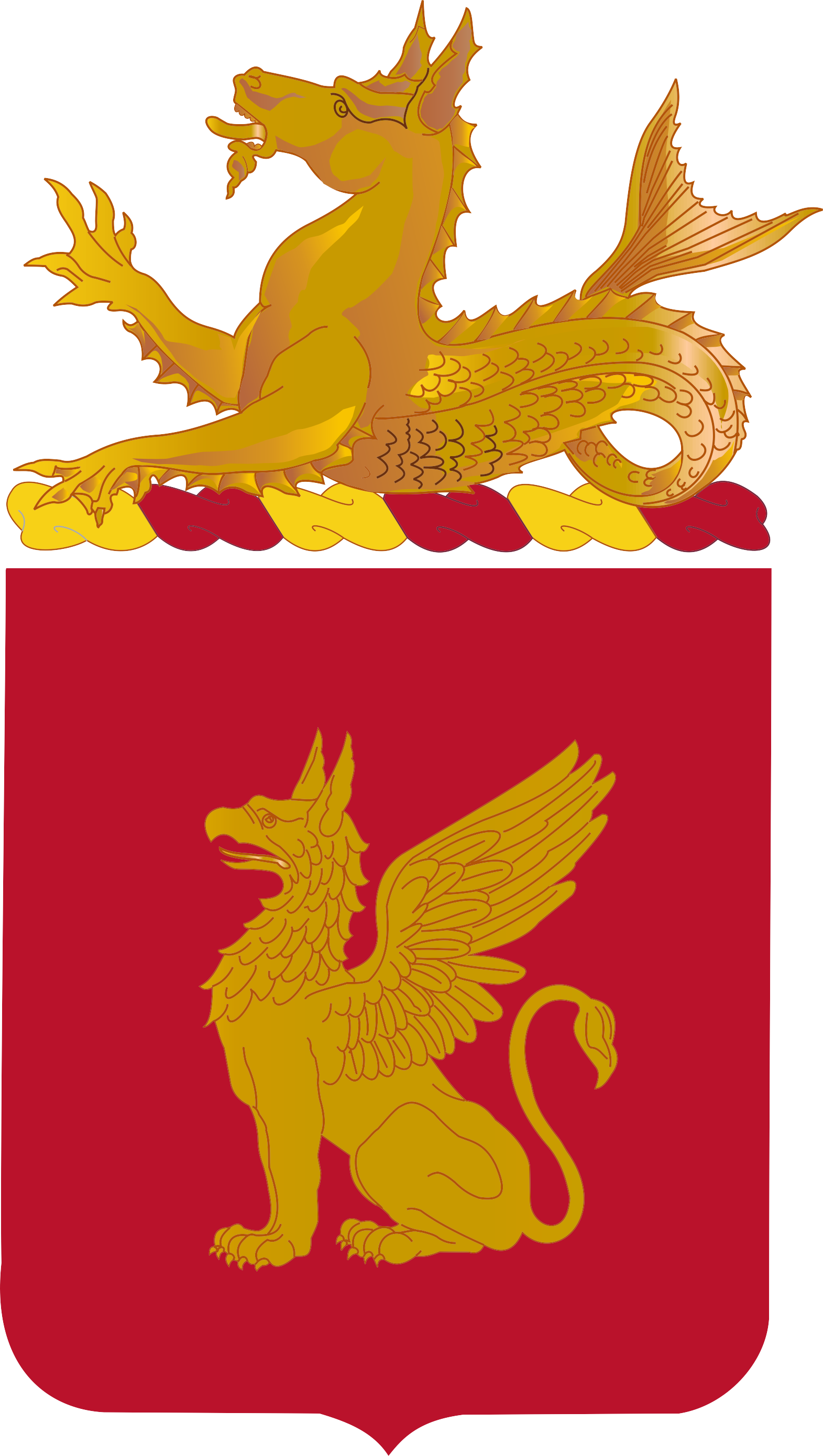
91st Coast Artillery
"Verdus et Fidelis Semper" (Always True and Faithful)

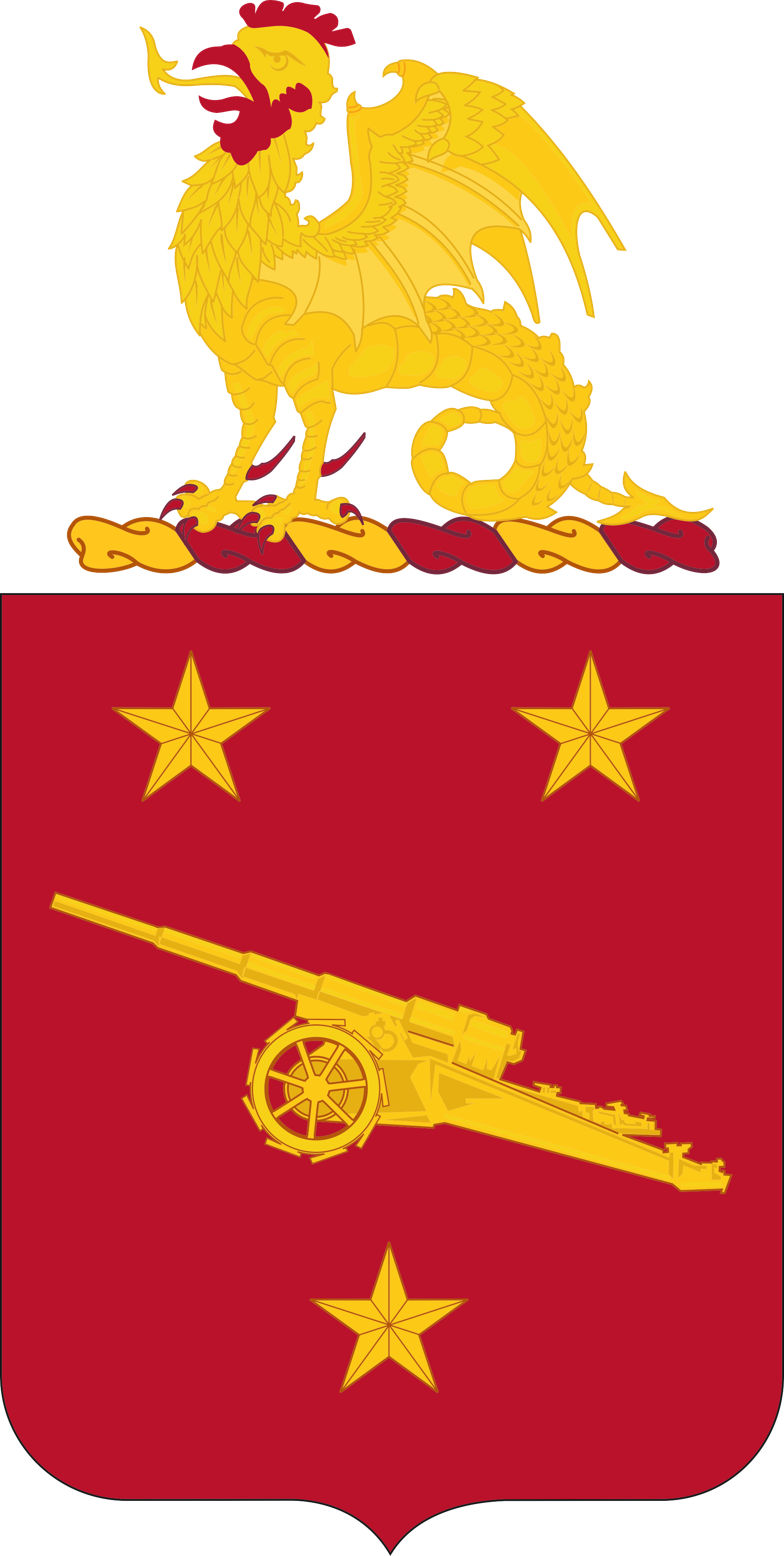
92nd Coast Artillery
"Always Ready"

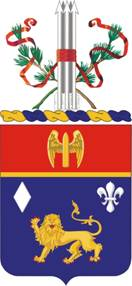
197th Coast Artillery
""A Bas L’Avion" (Down With The Plane)

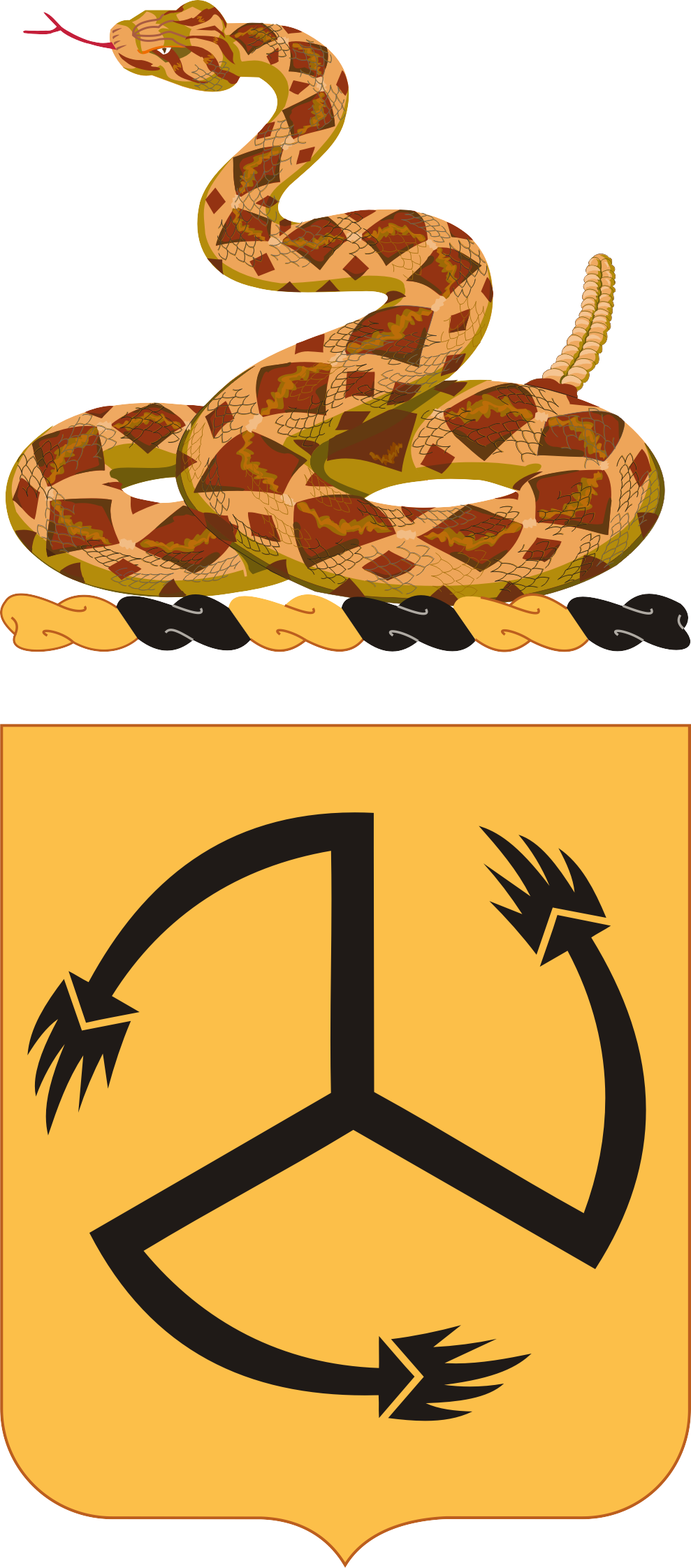
200th Coast Artillery
"Pro Civitate et Patria" (For state and country)

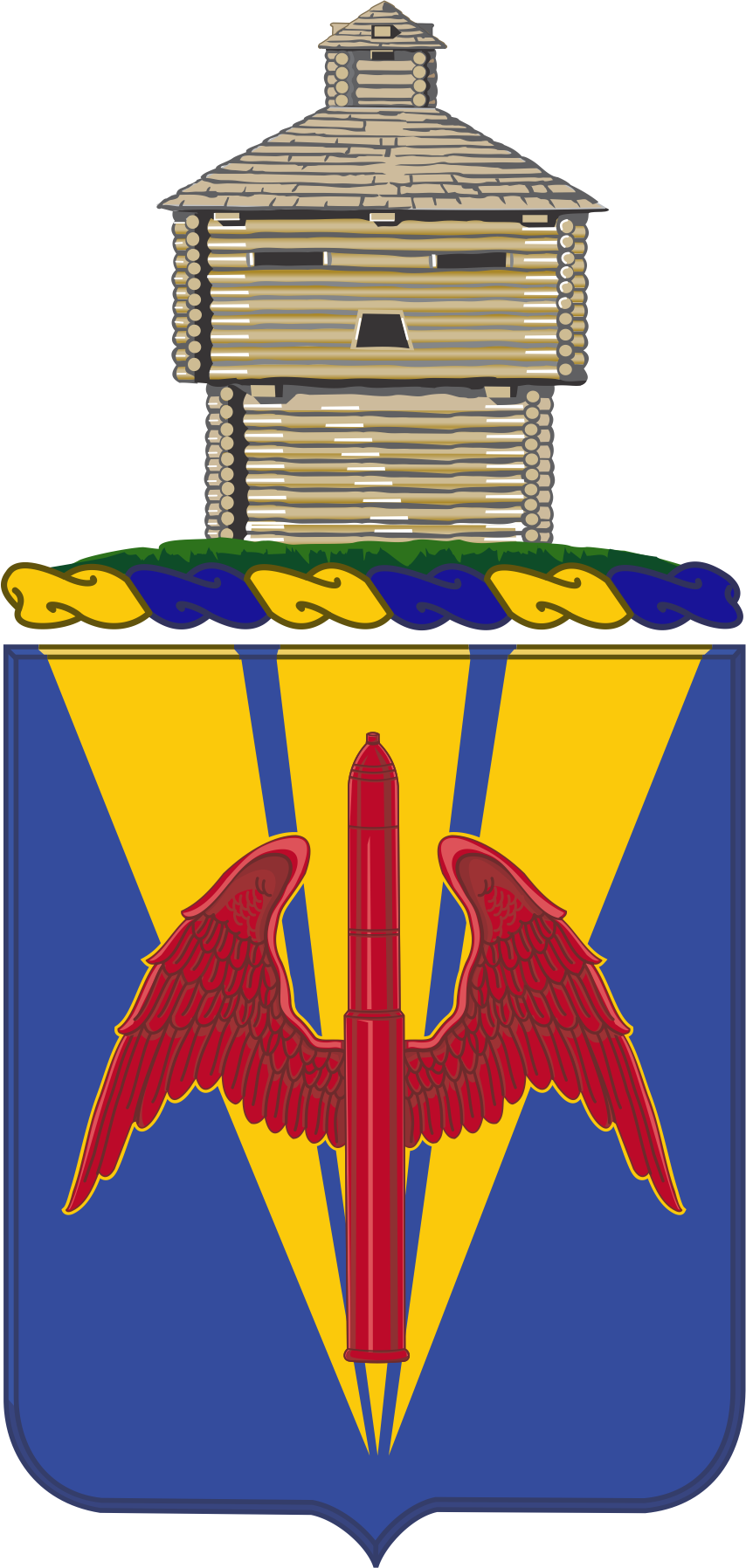
202nd Coast Artillery
"Arte et Armis" (Art of Arms)

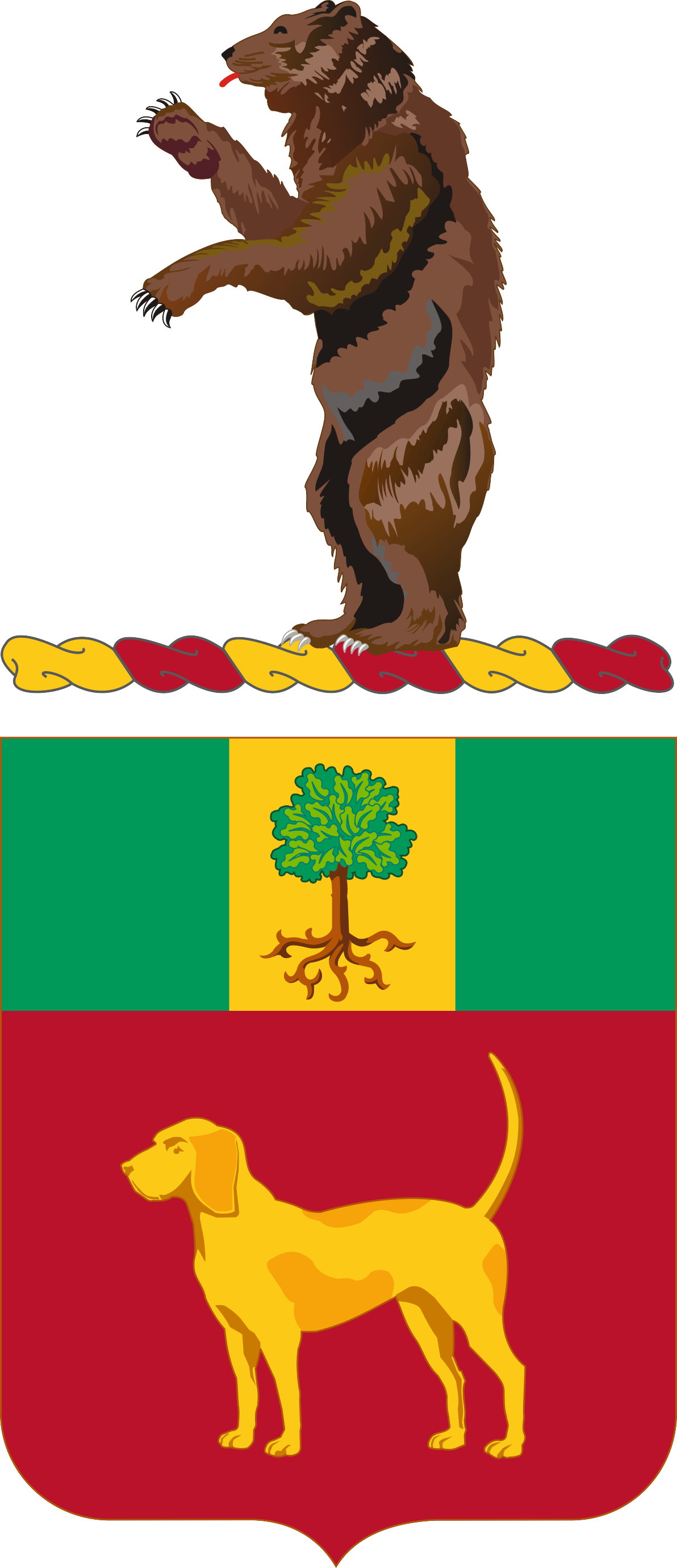
203d Coast Artillery
""Don't Kick Our Dog"

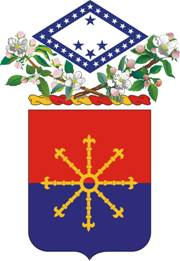
206th Coast Artillery
"Never Give Up"

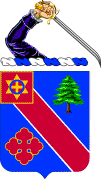
211th Coast Artillery
"It Points the Way"

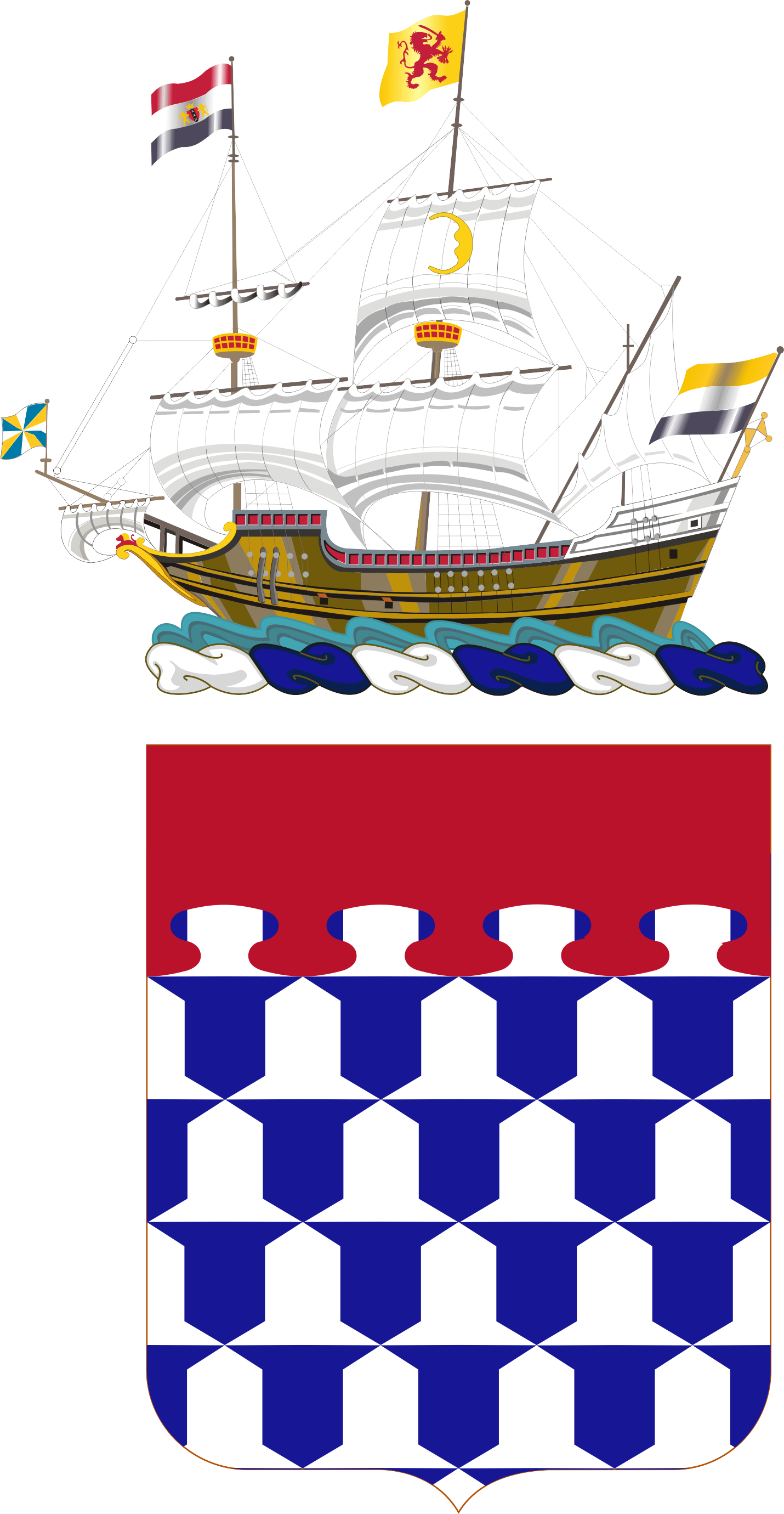
212th Coast Artillery
"Pro Patria" (For Country)"

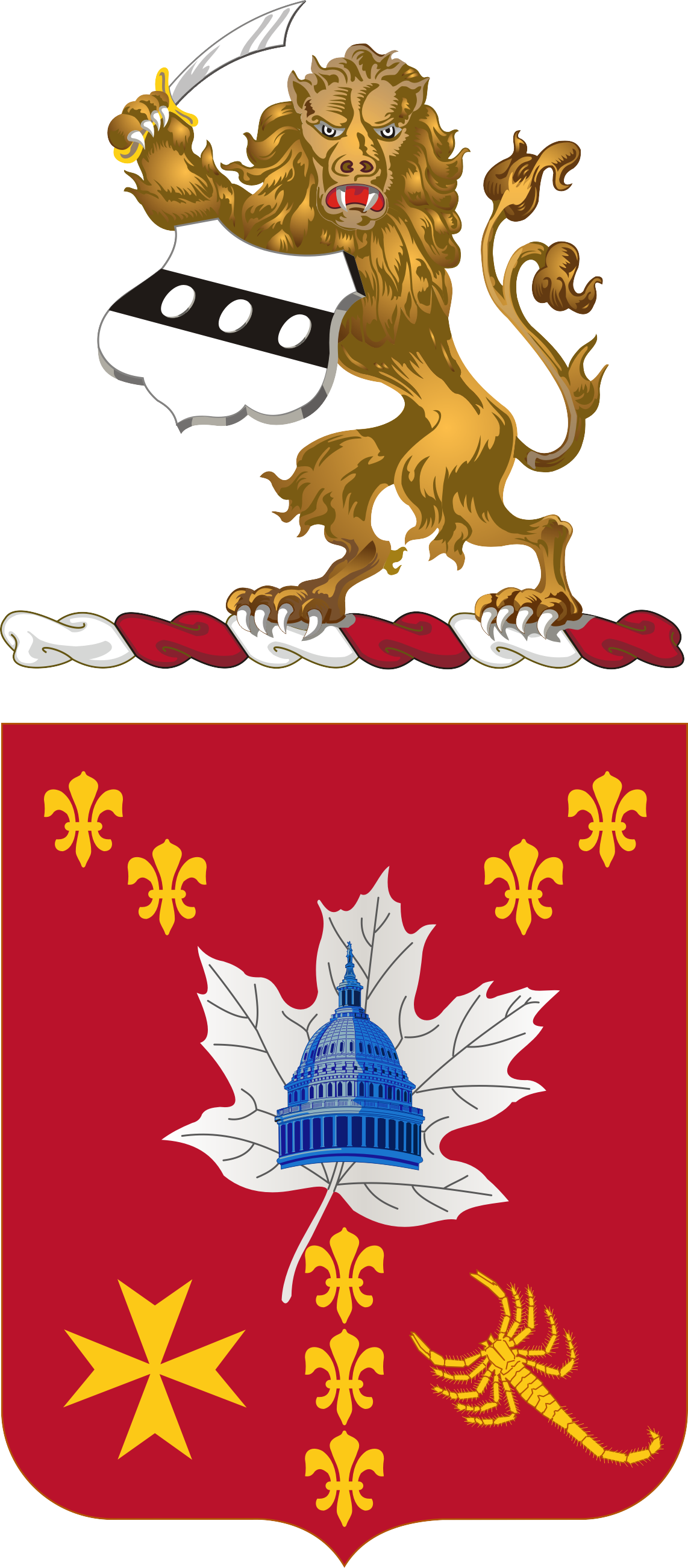
213th Coast Artillery
"THE FIRST DEFENDERS

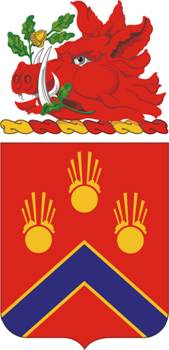
214th Coast Artillery
"We Hear and Strike"

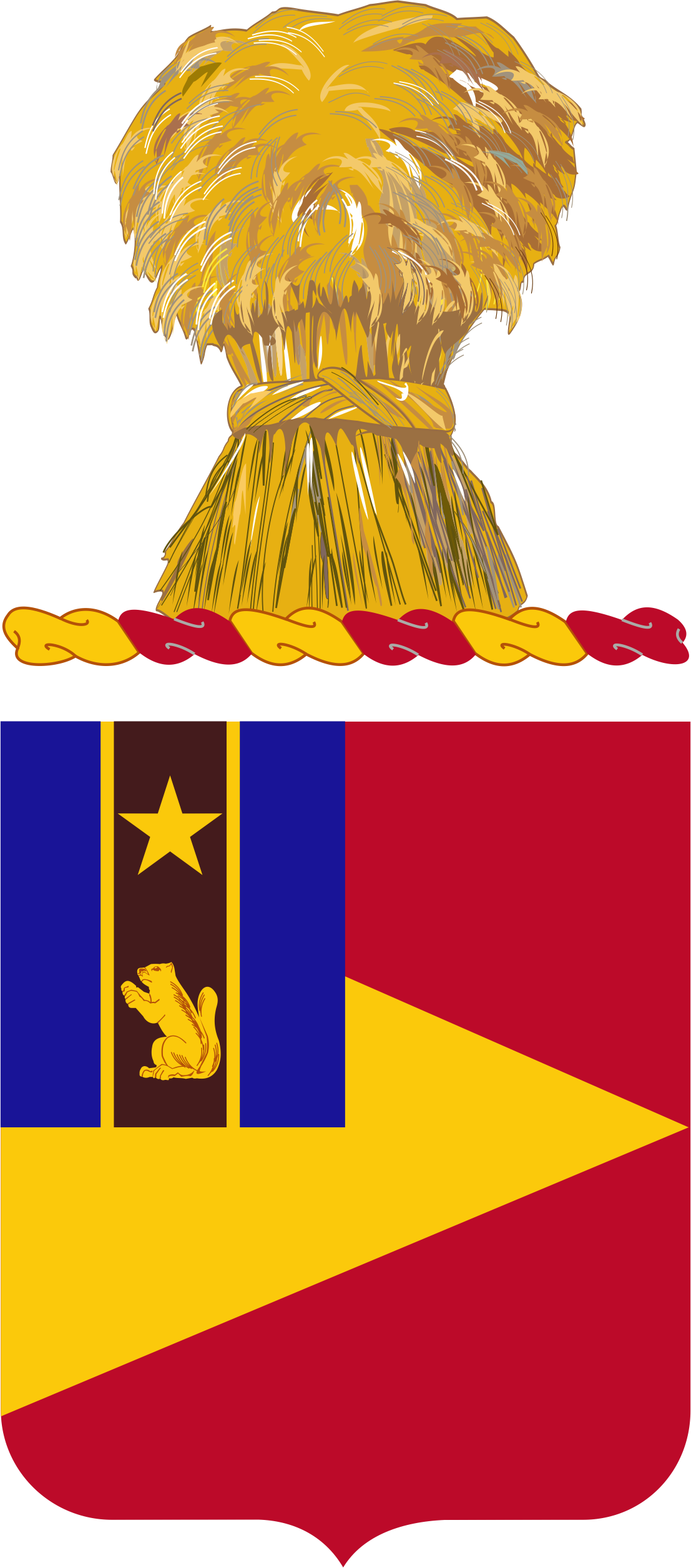
215th Coast Artillery
"Viking Vanguard"

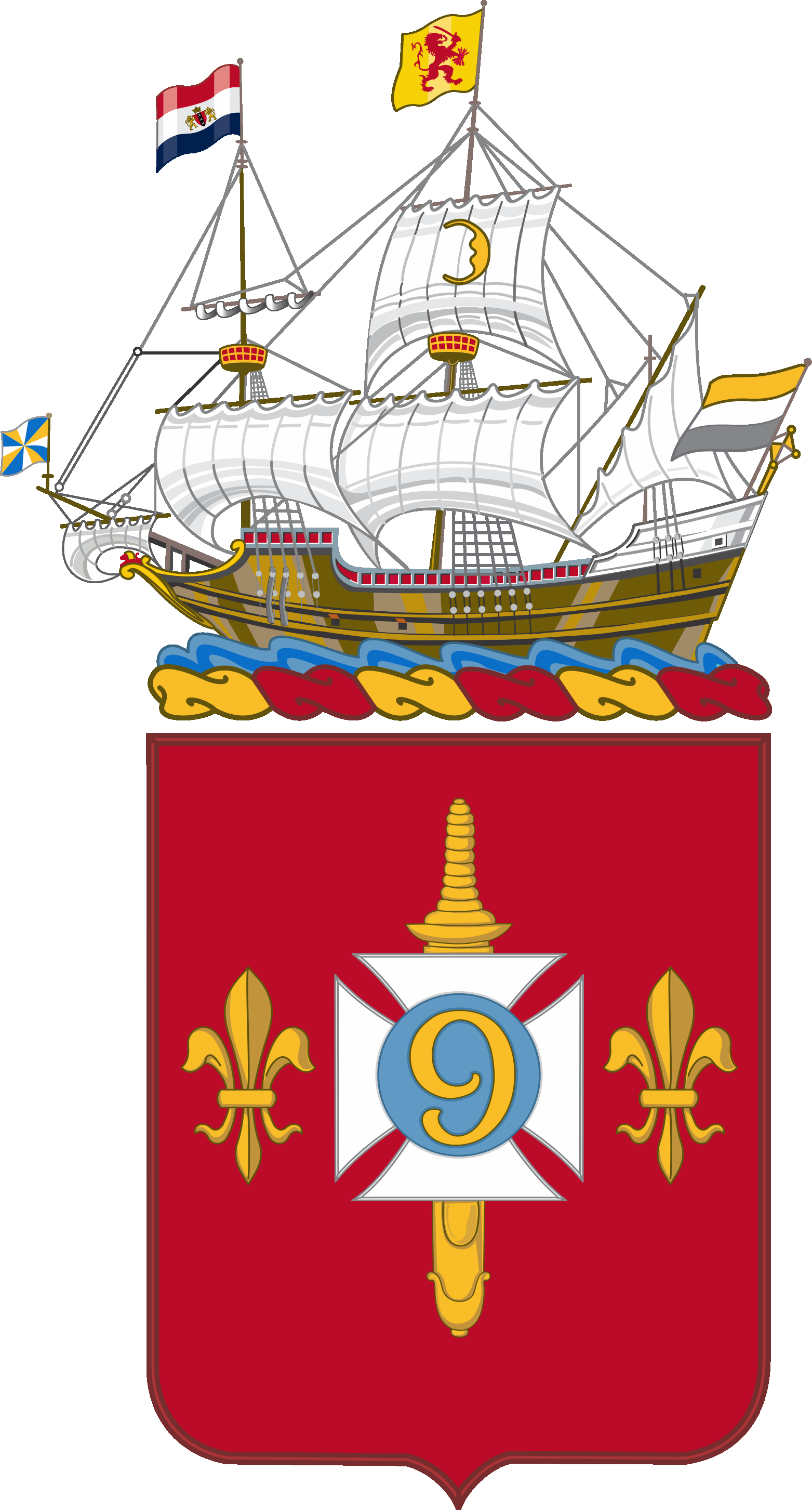
244th Coast Artillery
"Ratione Aut Vi (By Reason Or By Force)

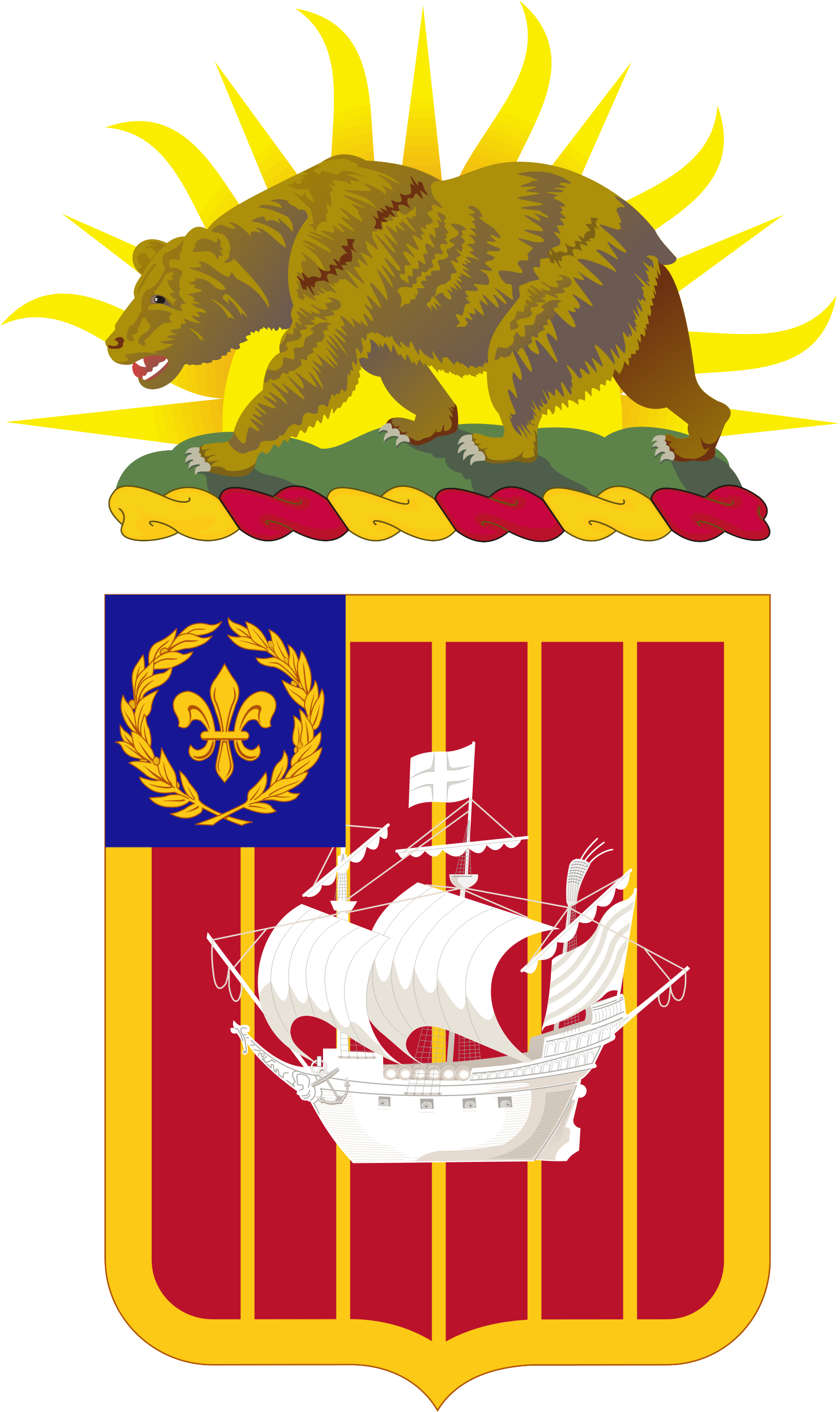
251st Coast Artillery
"We Aim to Hit"

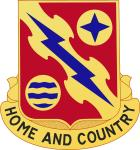
265th Coast Artillery
"Home and Country"

== Engineer units ==
=== 1 to 100 ===
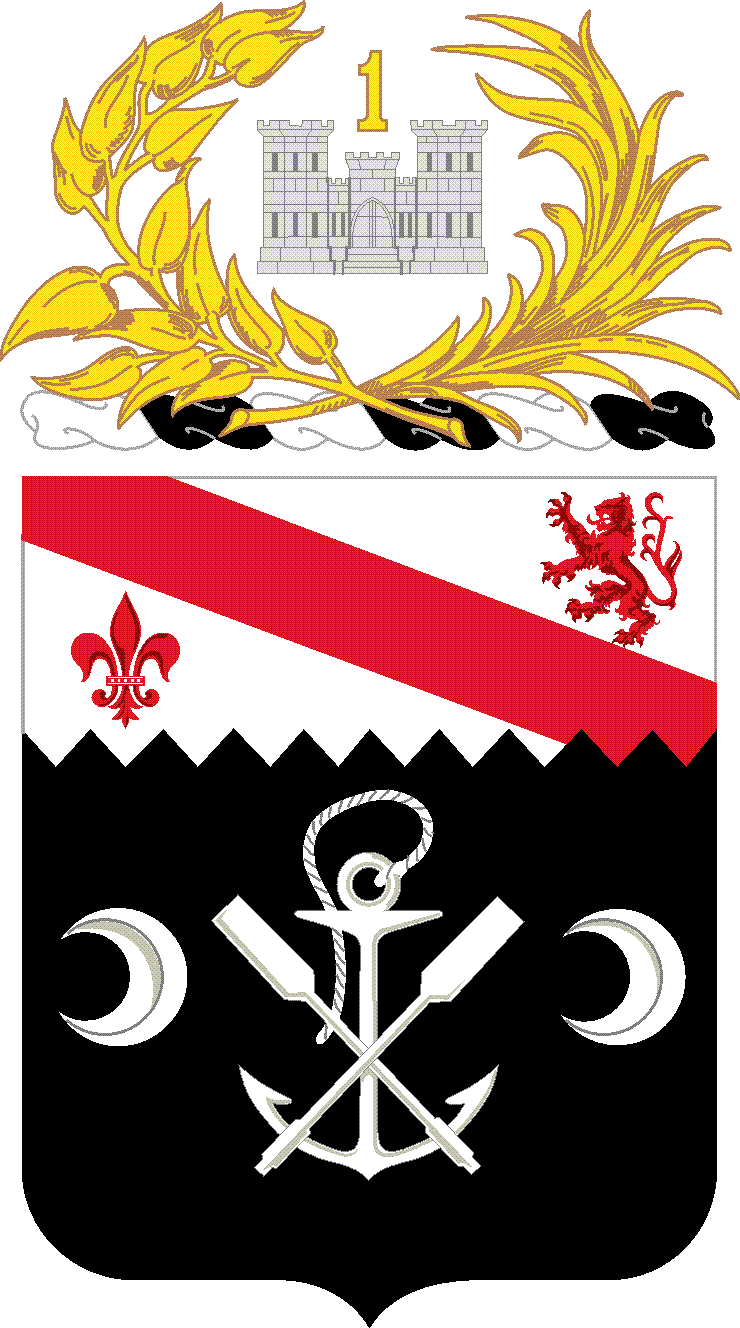
1st Engineer Battalion
"Always First"

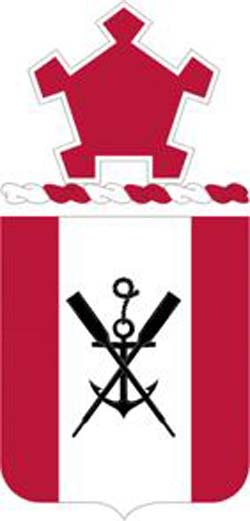
2nd Engineer Battalion
"Ardeur et Tenacite" (Eagerness and Tenacity)

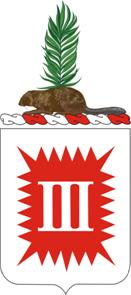
3rd Engineer Battalion
"Builders for Victory"

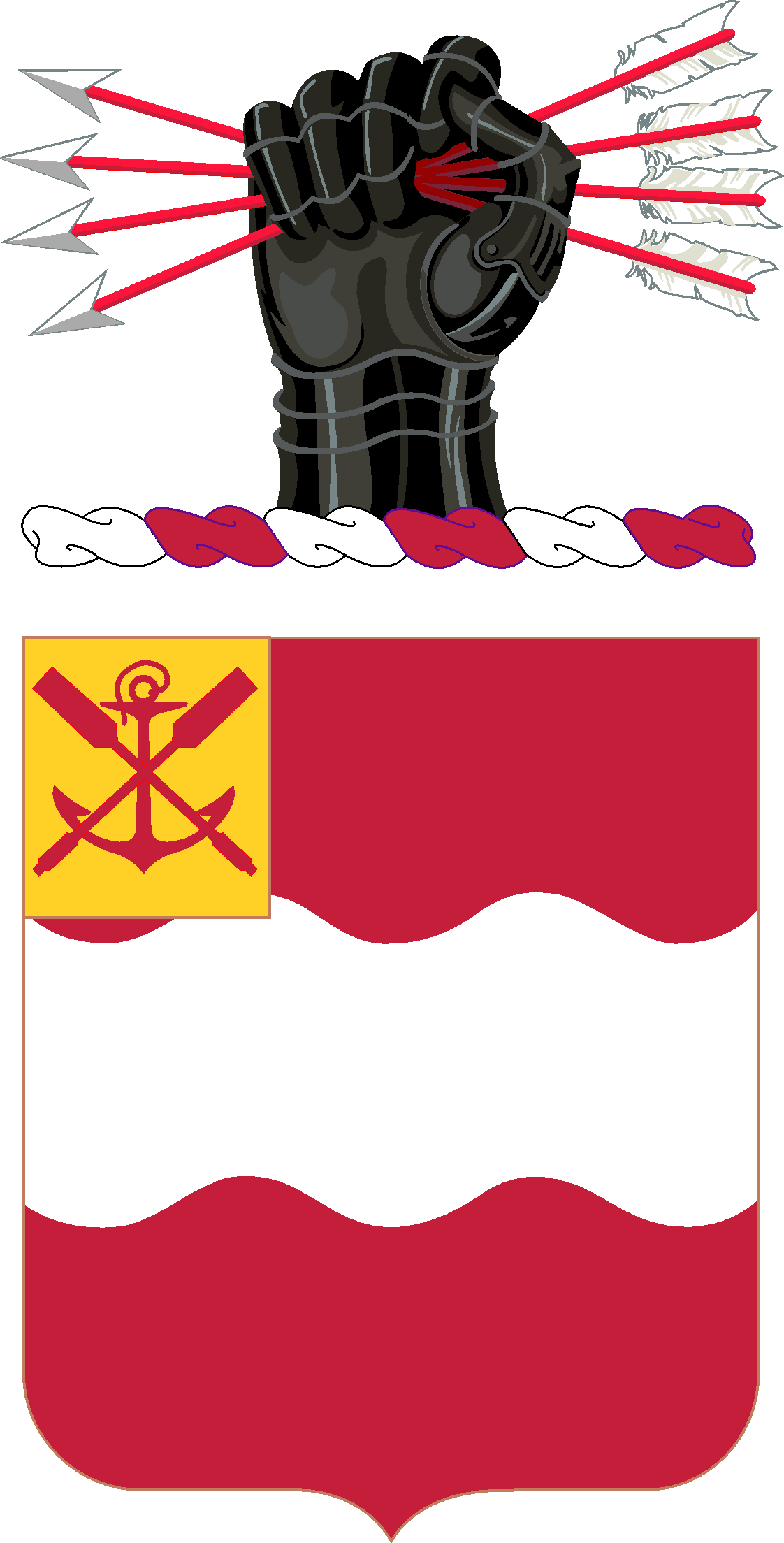
4th Engineer Battalion
"Volens et Potens" (Willing and Able)

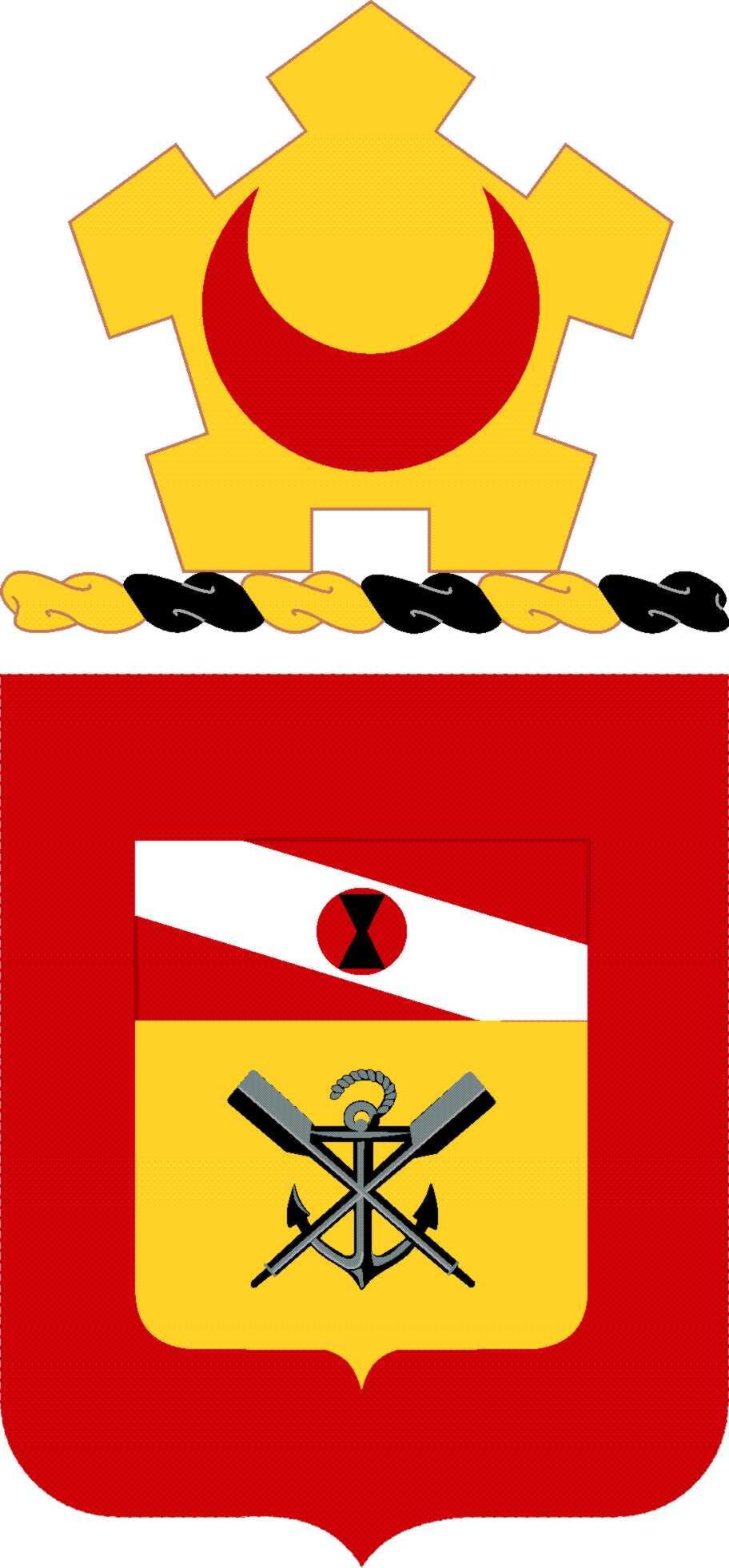
5th Engineer Battalion
"Courage, Skill, Strength"

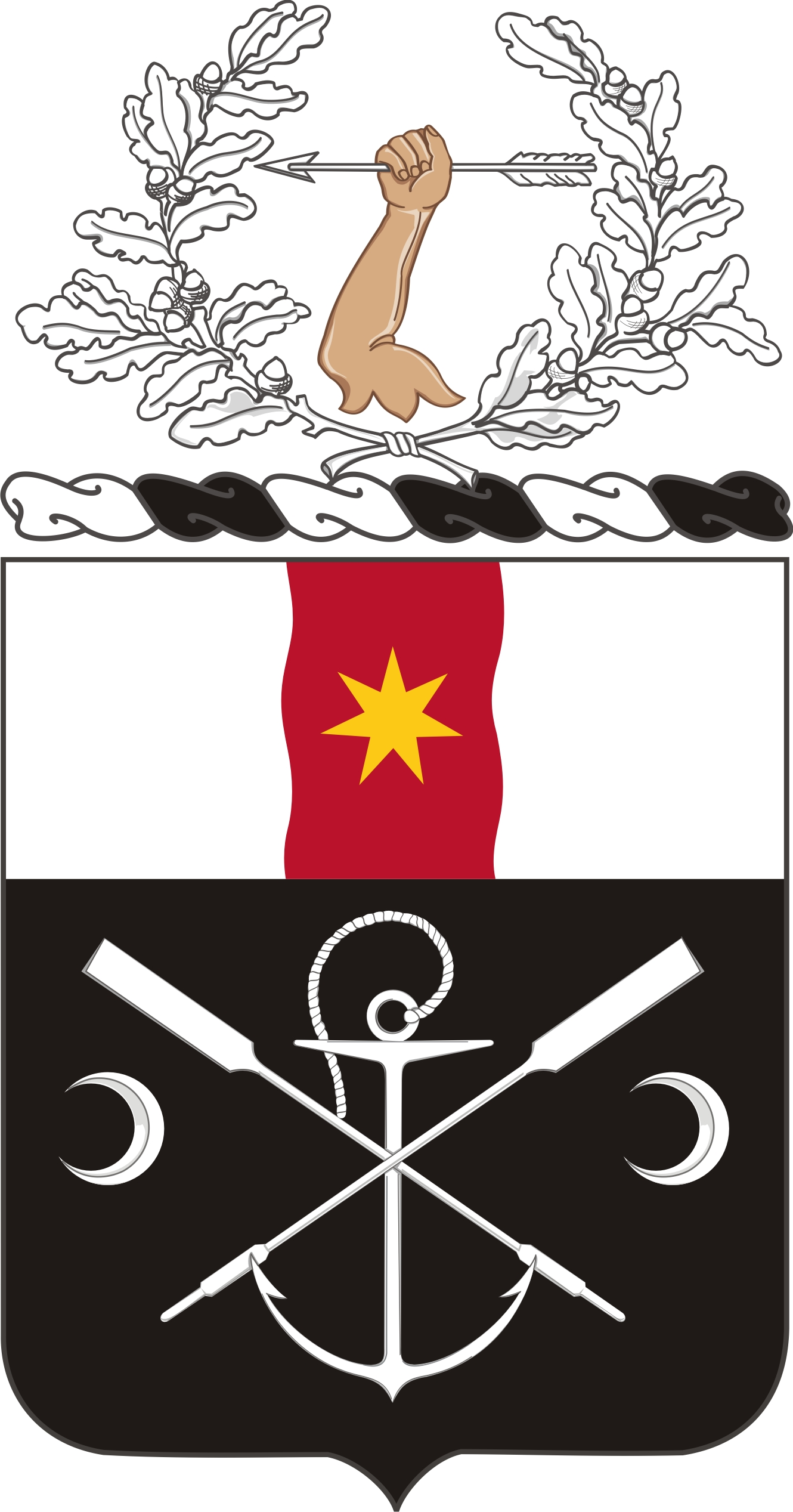
6th Engineer Battalion
"Clairs Chênes N'Oubliez Jamais" (The Cleared Oaks – Never Forget Them)
"Arctic Sappers"

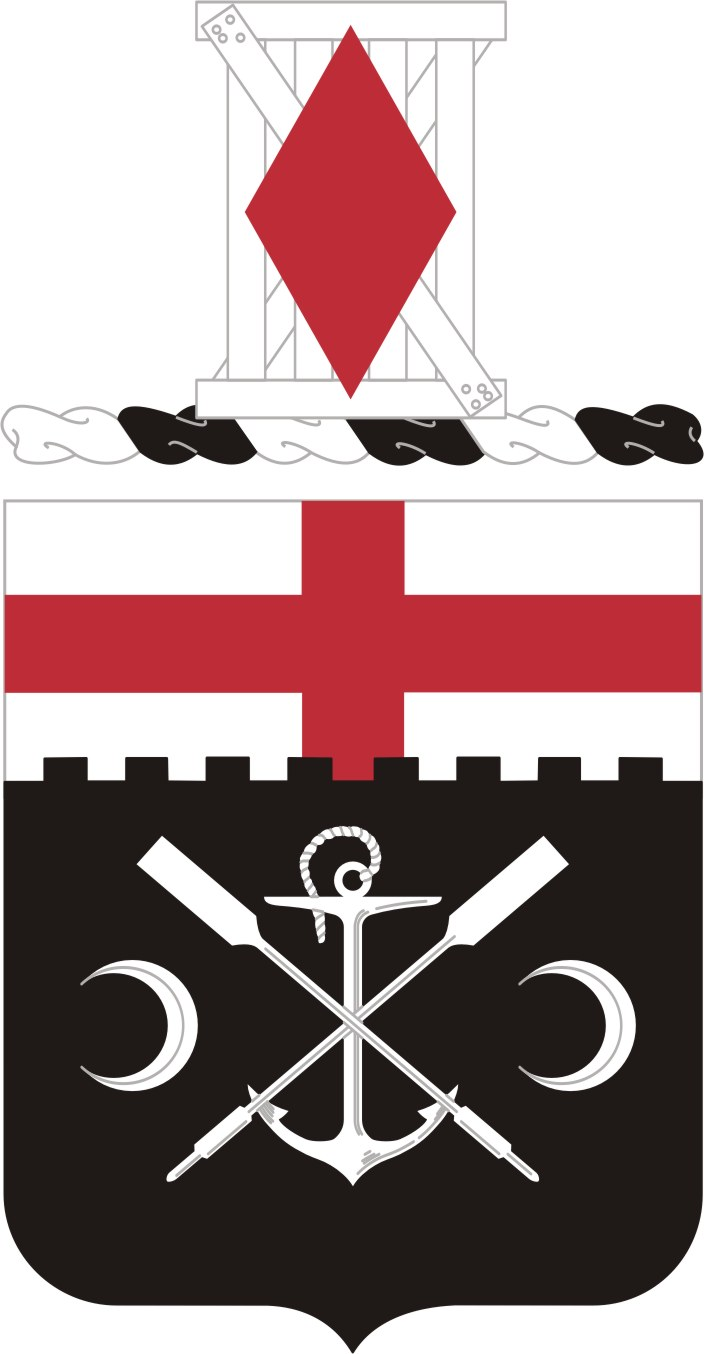
7th Engineer Battalion
"Seven Times Tested By Fire"
"Hammer Battalion"

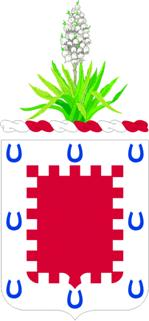
8th Engineer Battalion
"Multum in Parvo" (Much in Little)
"Trojan Horse"

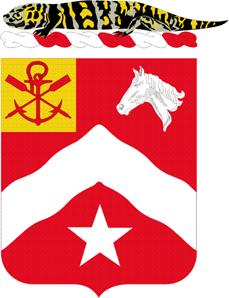
9th Engineer Battalion
"Asistiremos" (We Will Assist)

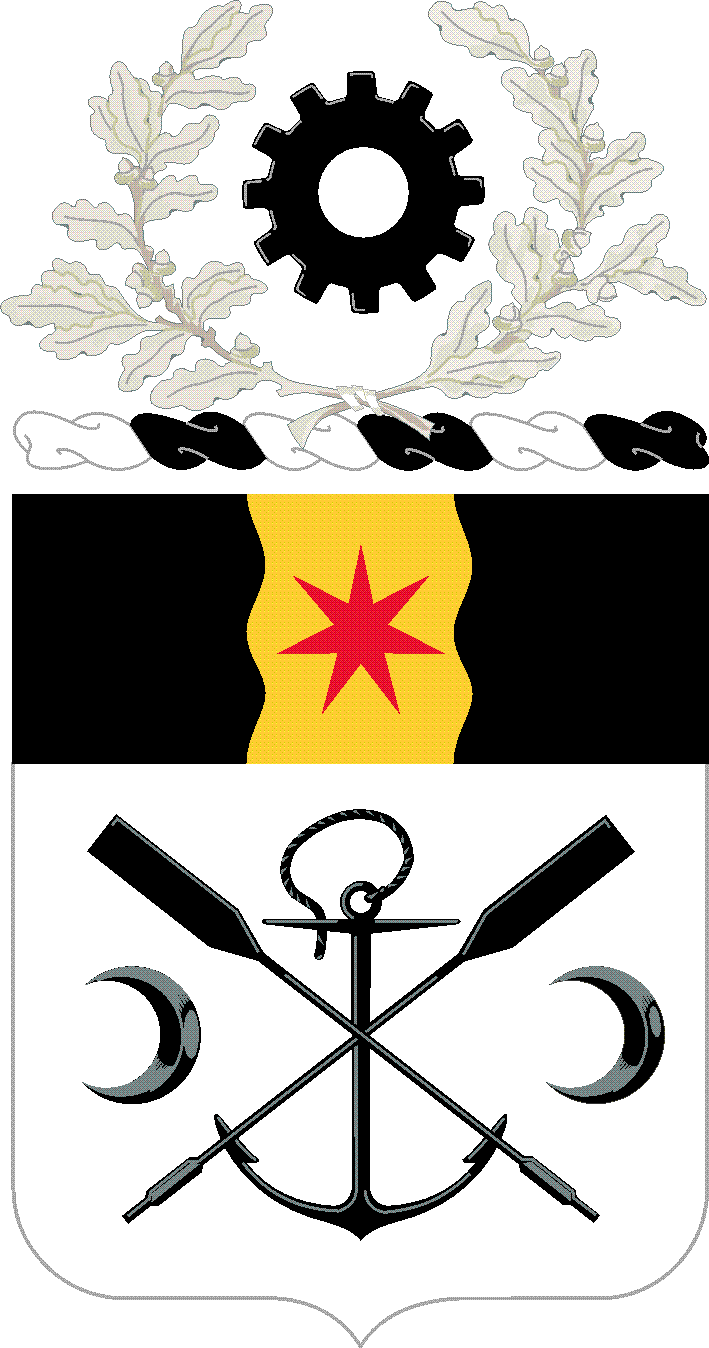
10th Engineer Battalion
"Laboramus Sustinere" (We Work to Assist)

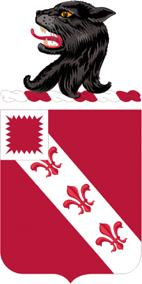
11th Engineer Battalion
"Forward"

12th Engineer Battalion
"Id Perficiemus" (We Shall Consummate the Task)

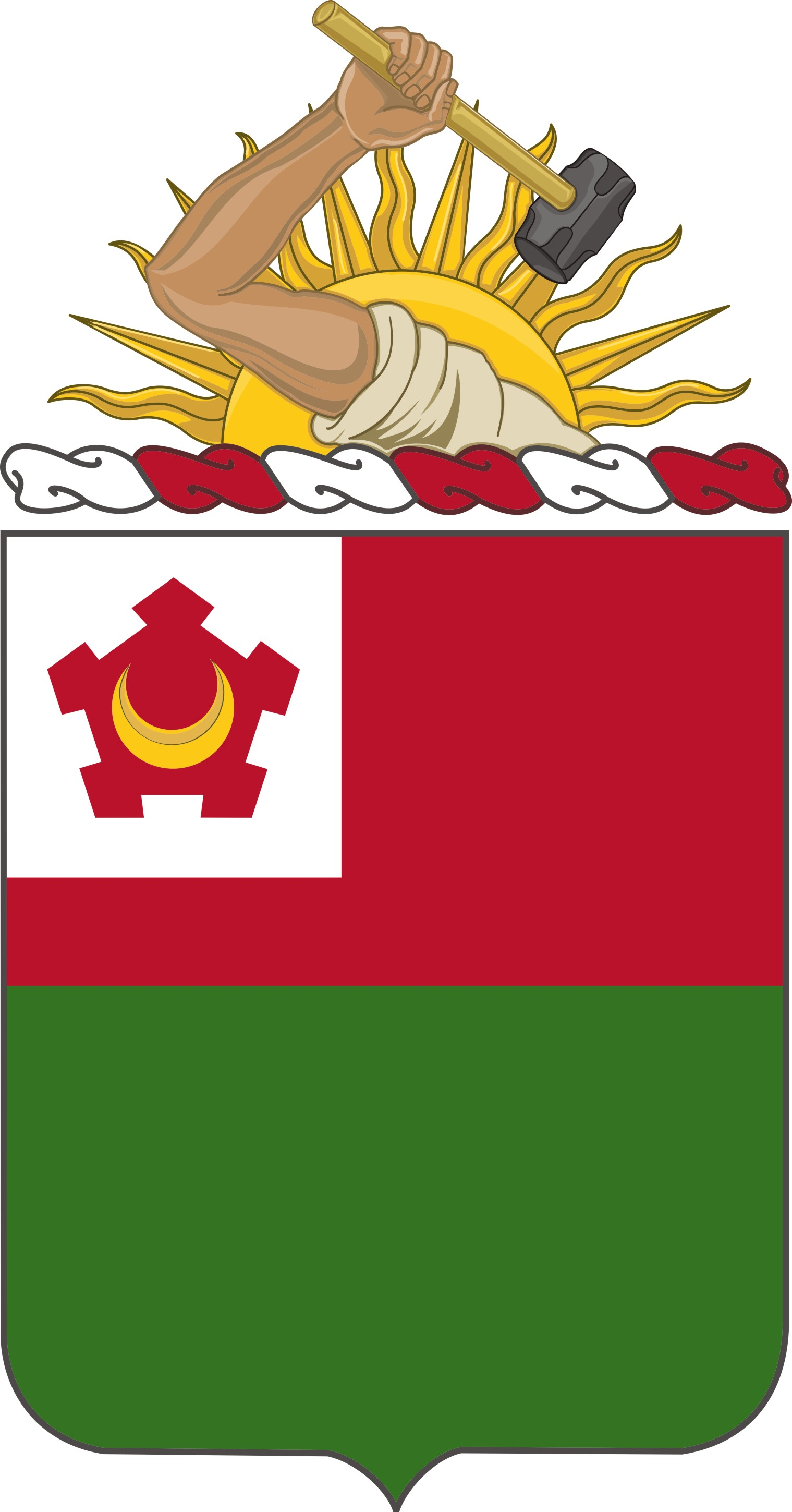
13th Engineer Battalion
"In Omnia Paratus" (In All Things Prepared)

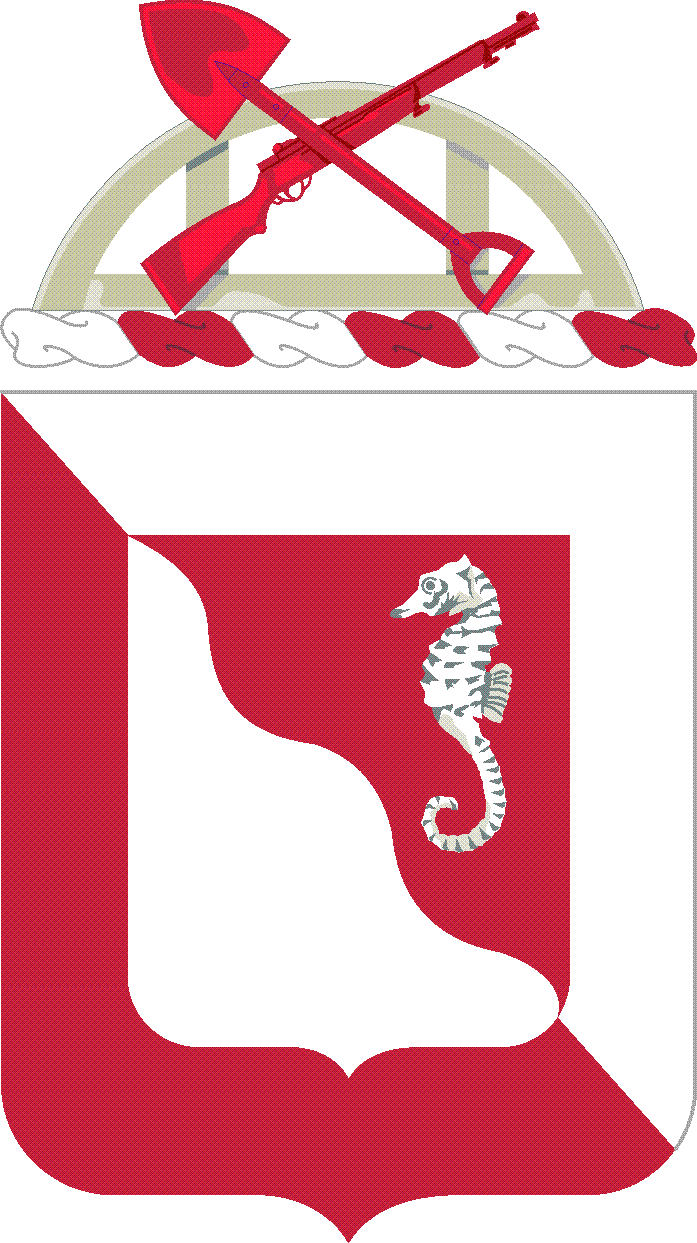
14th Engineer Battalion
"Gong Mu Ro" (Duty)

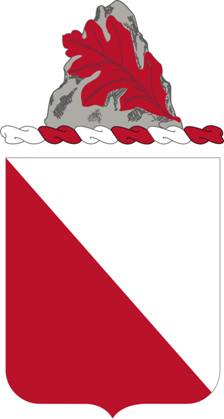
15th Engineer Battalion
"Drive On"

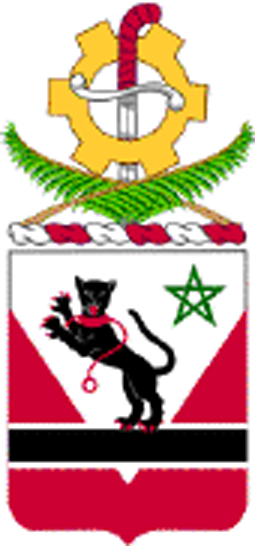
16th Engineer Battalion
"Semper Ultimo" (Always to the Top)

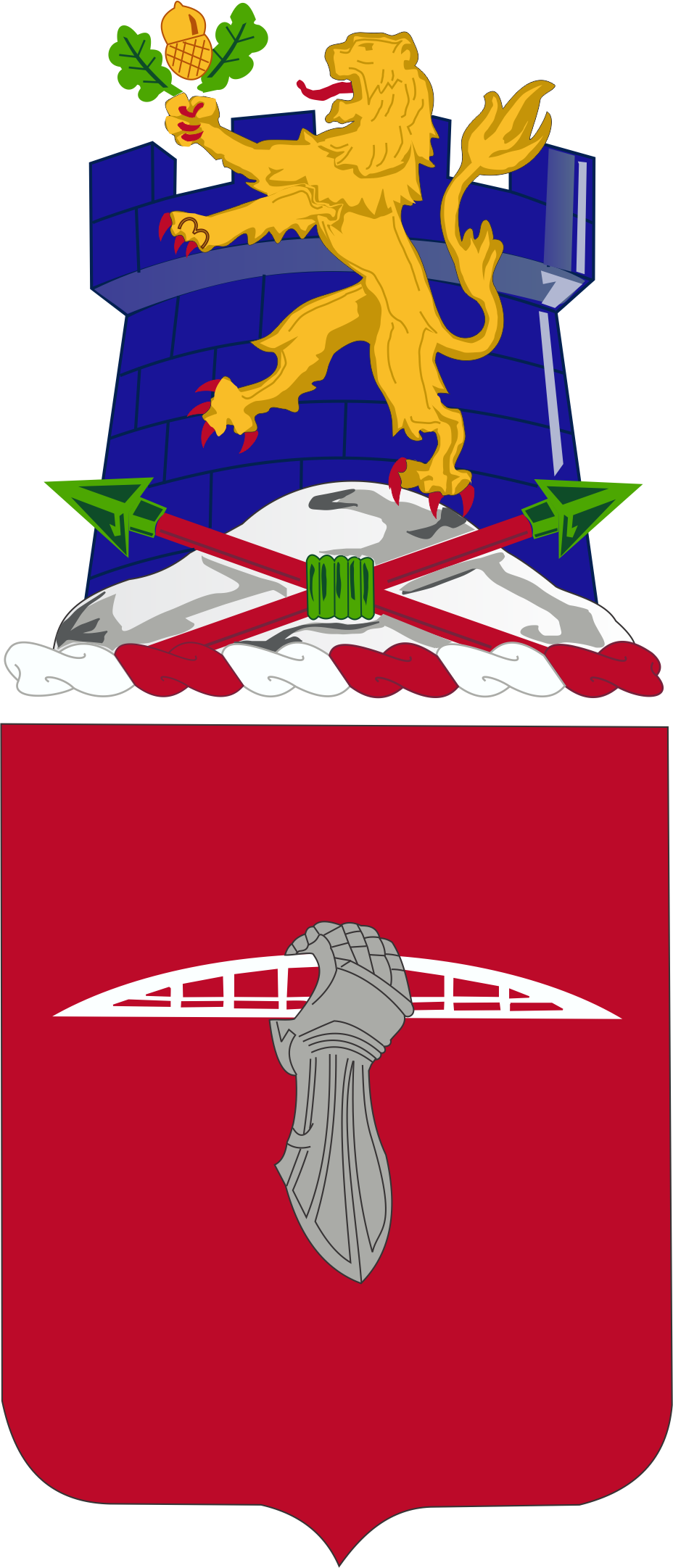
17th Engineer Battalion
"We Pave the Way"

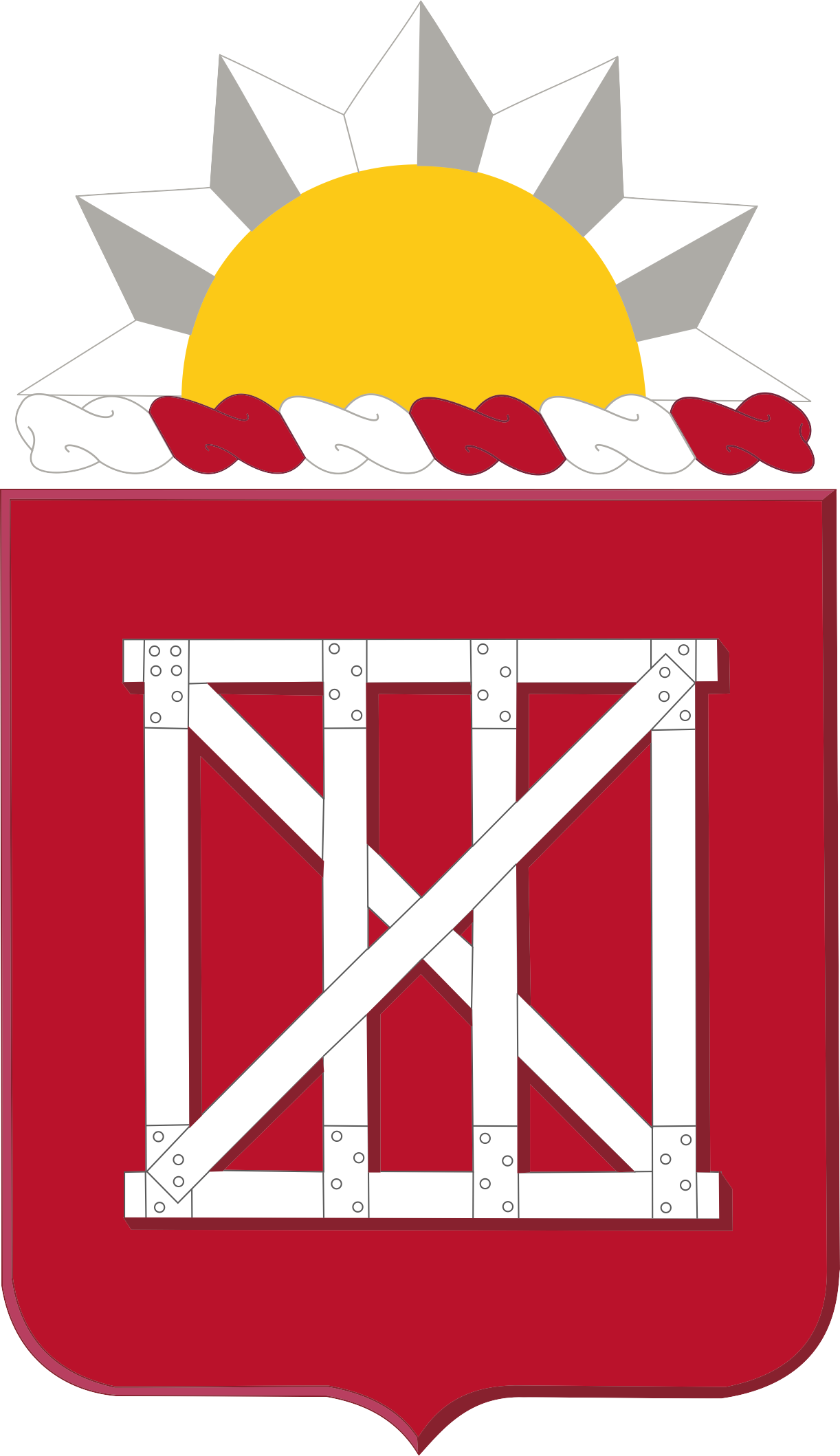
18th Engineer Battalion
"Honor, Courage, Glory"

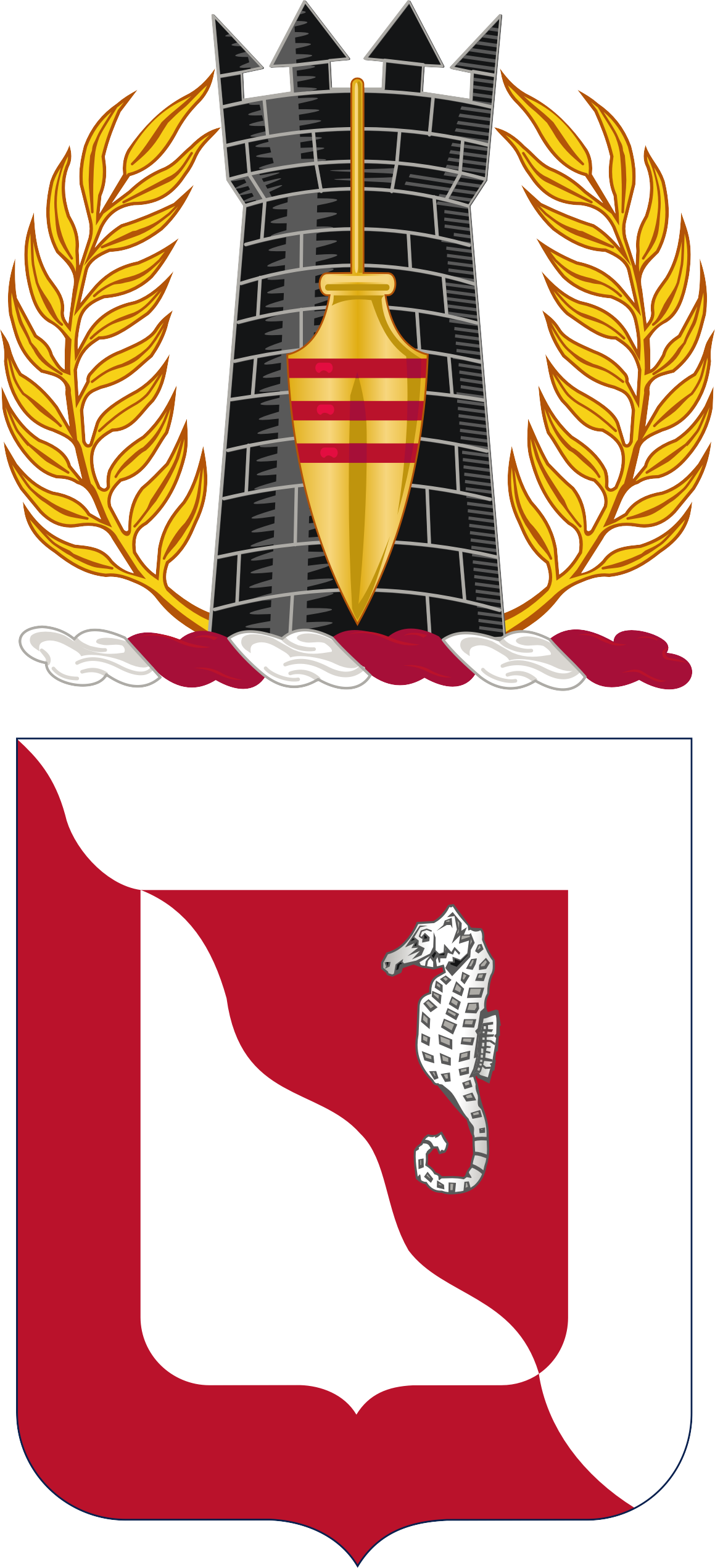
19th Engineer Battalion
"Acutum Acuman" (Sharpness of Ingenuity)

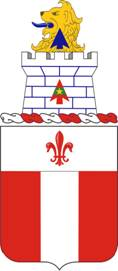
20th Engineer Battalion
"Condite et Pugnate" (Build and Fight)

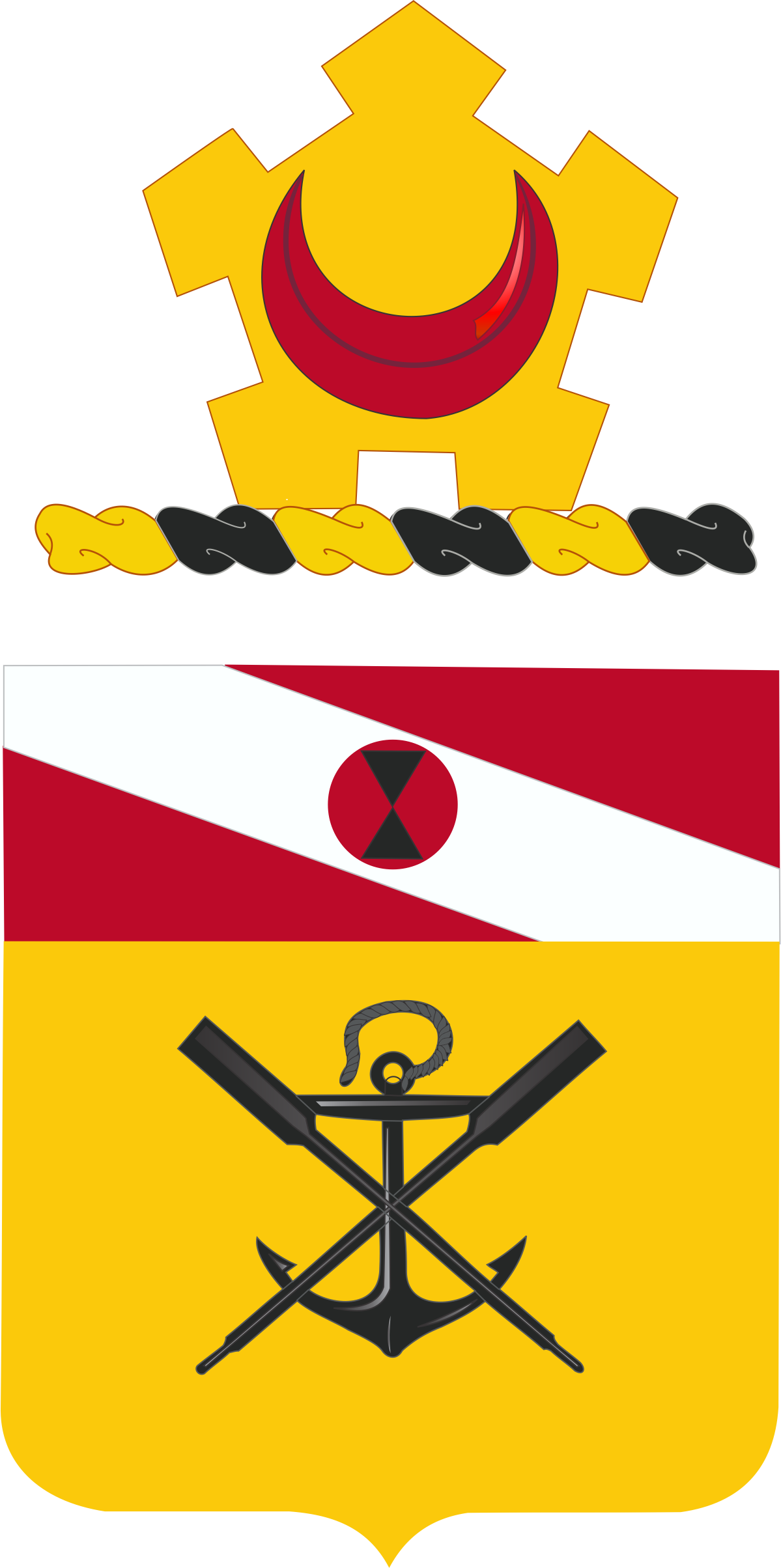
21st Engineer Battalion
"Forsee and Provide"

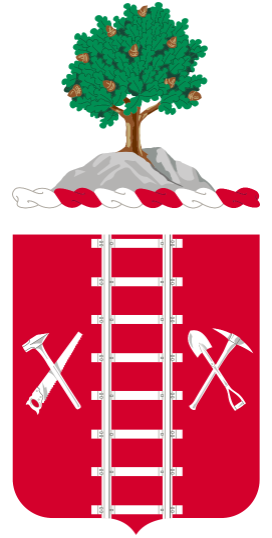
21st Engineer Regiment
"Expect Anything"

22nd Engineer Battalion
(coat of arms possibly not authorized)

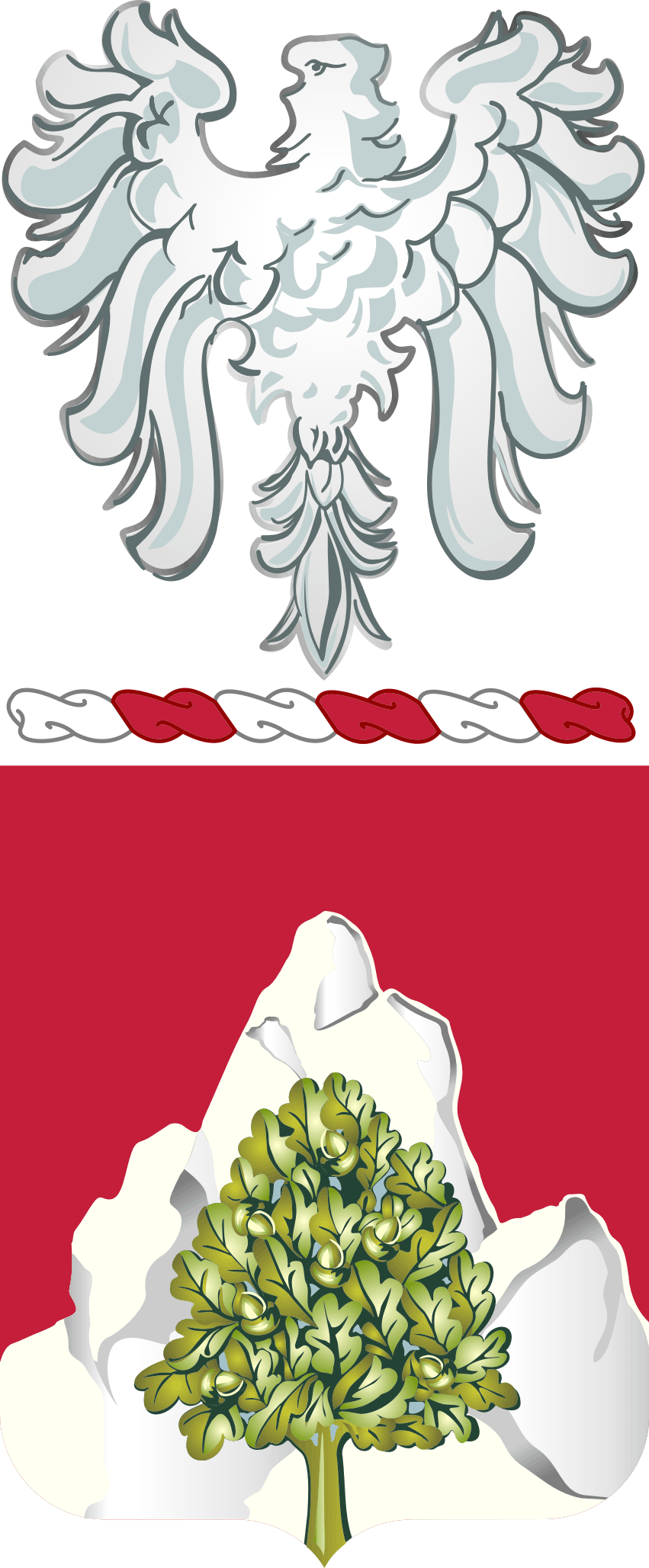
23rd Engineer Battalion
"Nous Servirons de Nouveau" (We Will Serve Again)

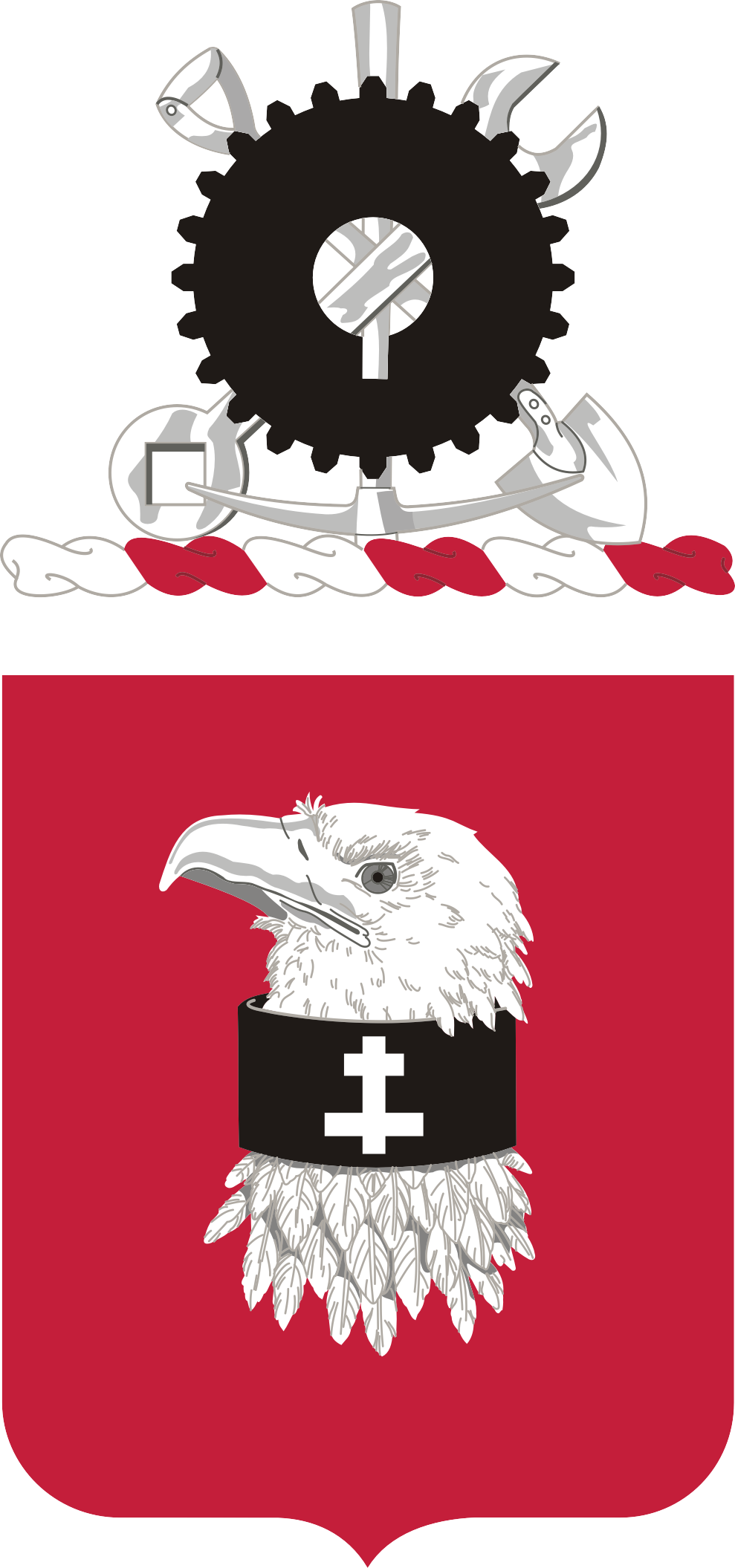
24th Engineer Battalion
No motto

25th Engineer Battalion
(coat of arms possibly not authorized)

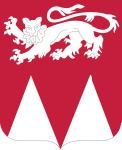
26th Engineer Battalion
"Way of the Victors"

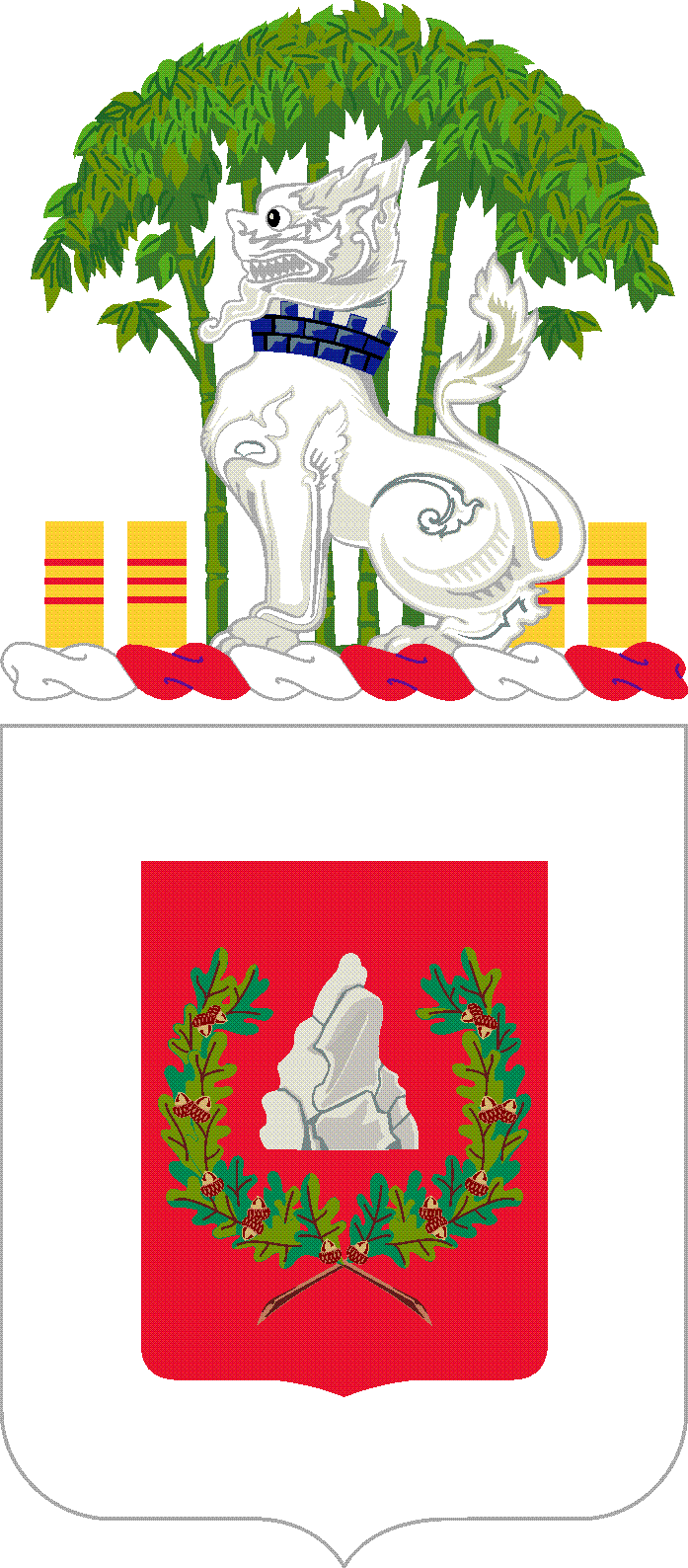
27th Engineer Battalion
"Omnes Res Bene Facere" (To Do All Things Well)

28th Engineer Battalion

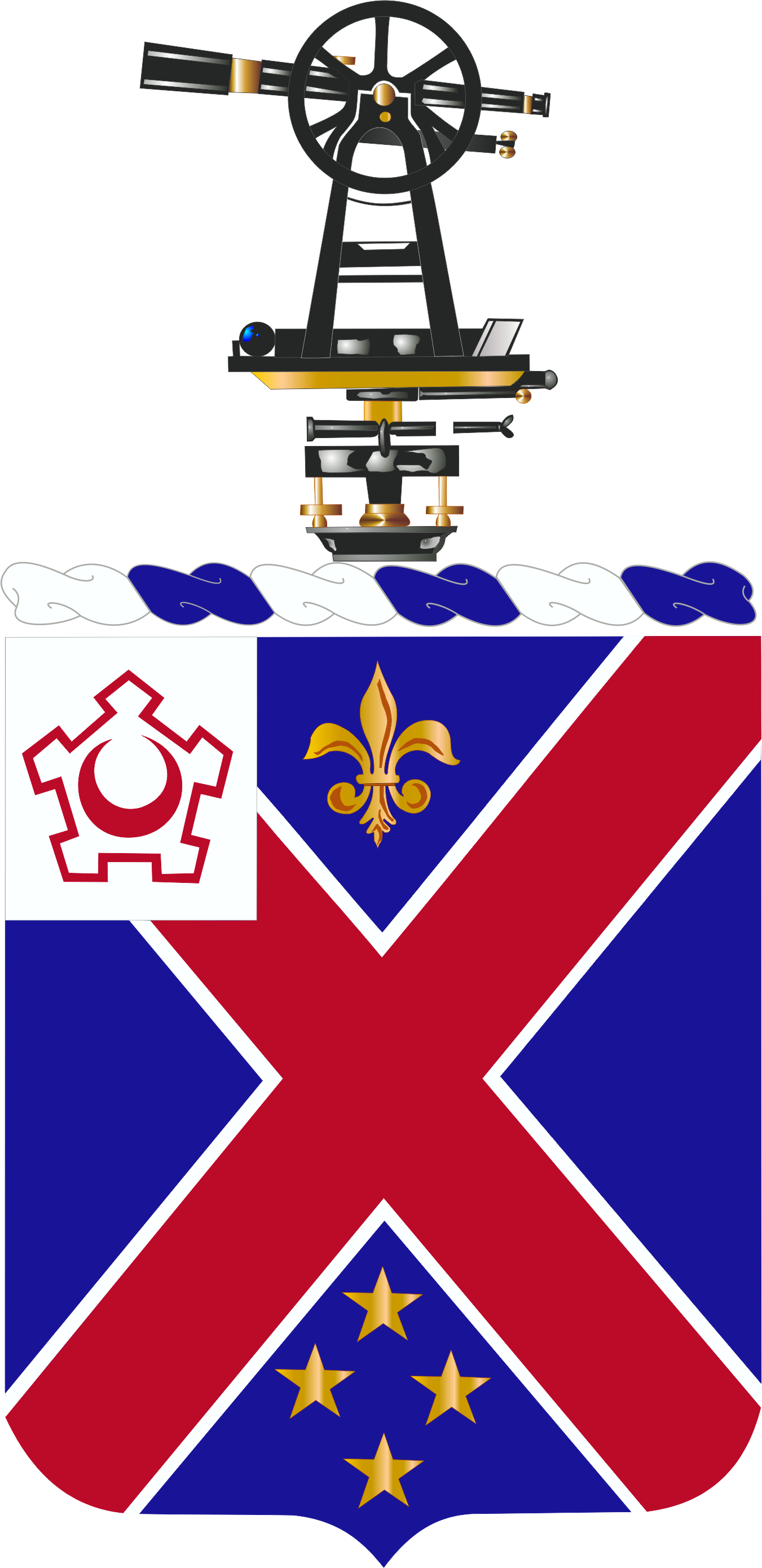
29th Engineer Battalion
"Praevalemus" (We Succeed)

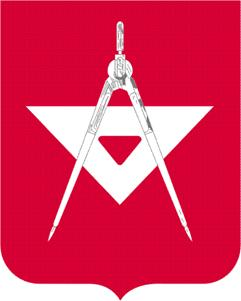
30th Engineer Battalion
"Imprimis" (In the First Place)

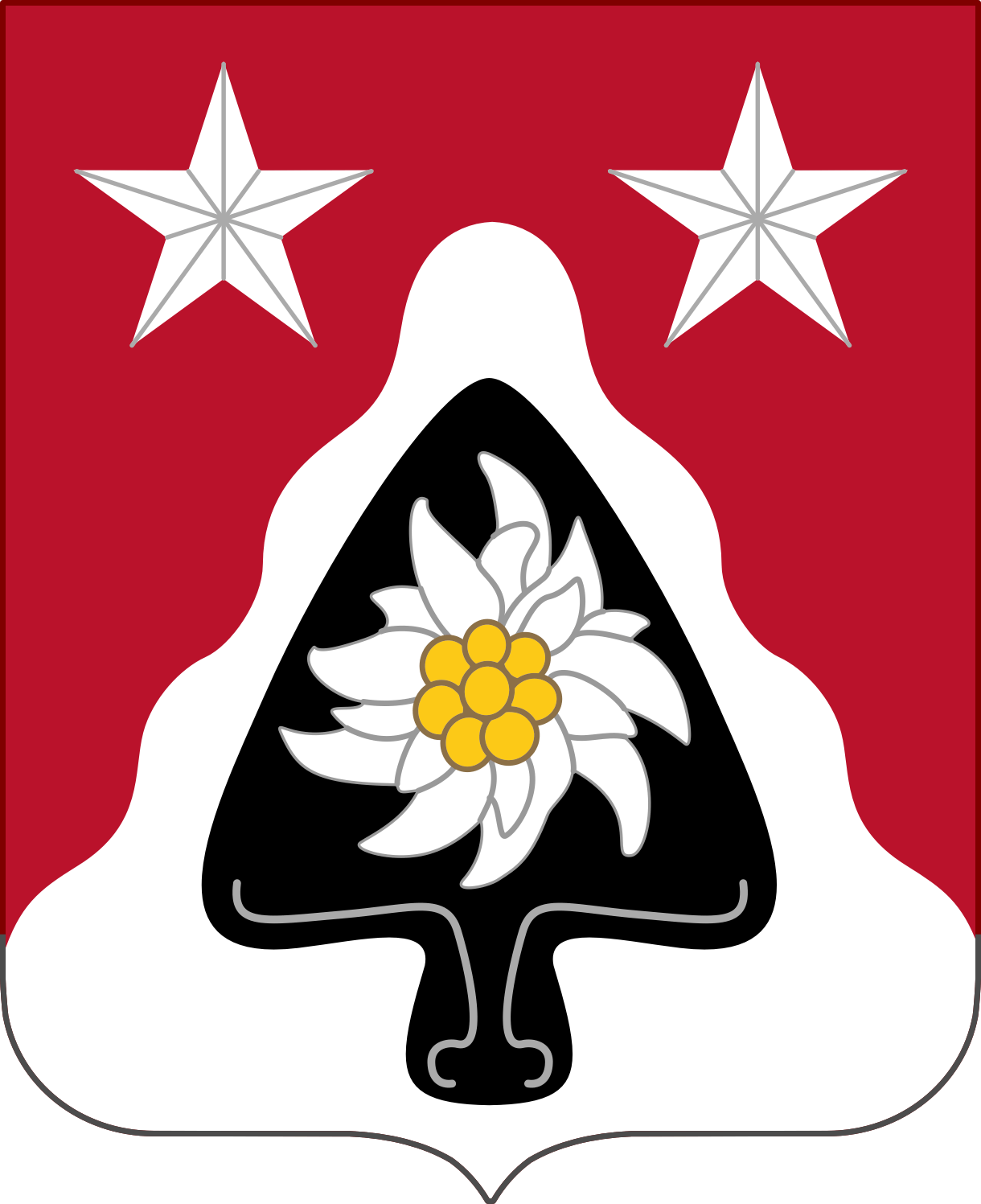
31st Engineer Battalion
"Demonstramus" (We Demonstrate)

32nd Engineer Battalion

33rd Engineer Battalion

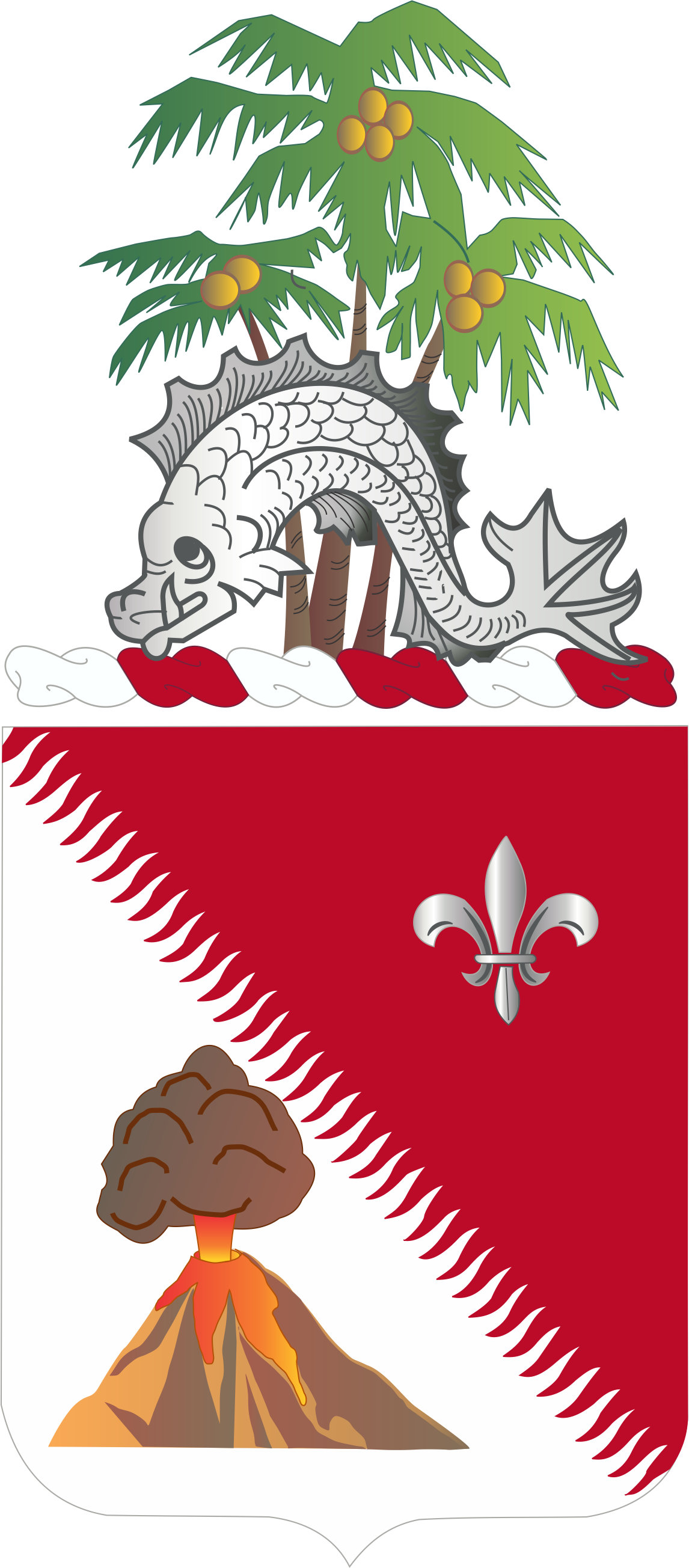
34th Engineer Battalion
"Defend and Build"

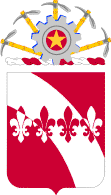
35th Engineer Battalion
"Ability, Courage, Results"

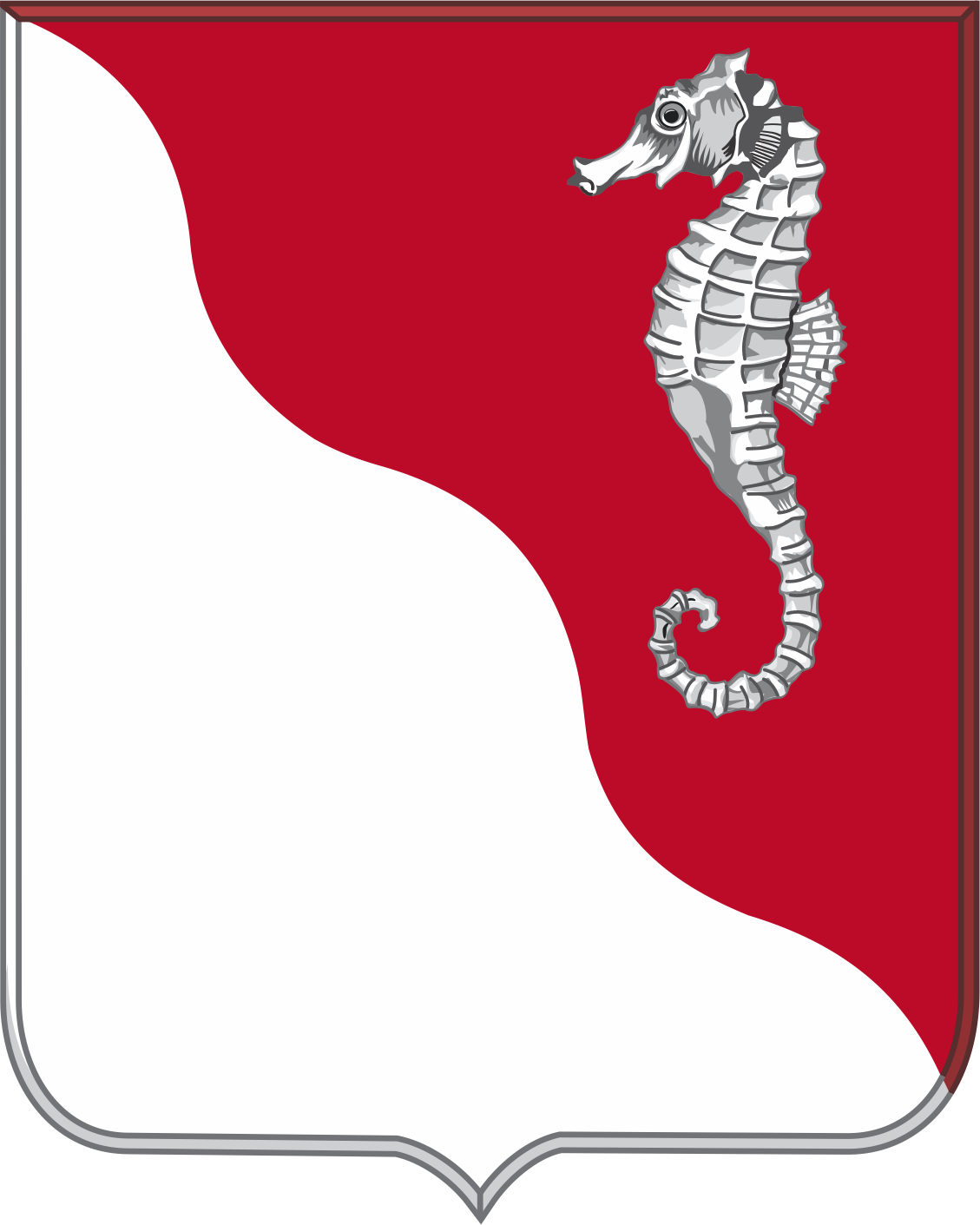
36th Engineer Battalion
"Rugged"

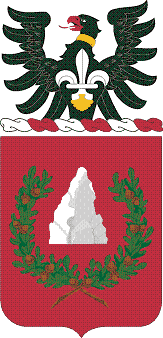
37th Engineer Battalion
"Fortuna Infortuna Forti Una" (Fortune or Misfortune is all the same to the Man of Stout Heart)

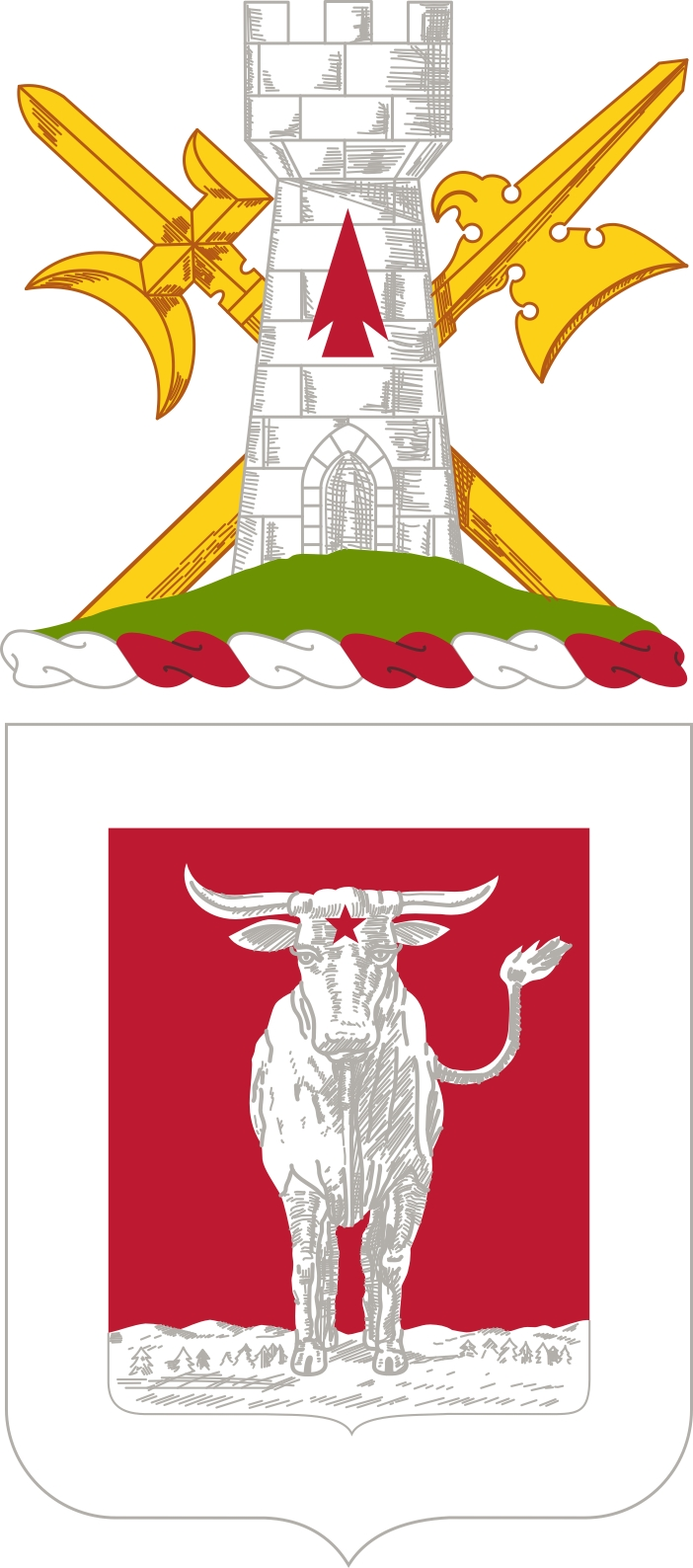
39th Engineer Battalion
"Fight, Build and Destroy"

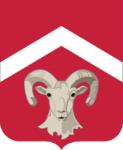
40th Engineer Battalion
"Constructio et Destructio" (Construction and Destruction)

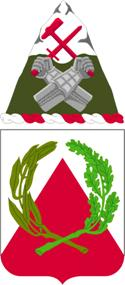
41st Engineer Battalion
"Vigor et Valor" (Strength and Spirit)

43rd Engineer Battalion

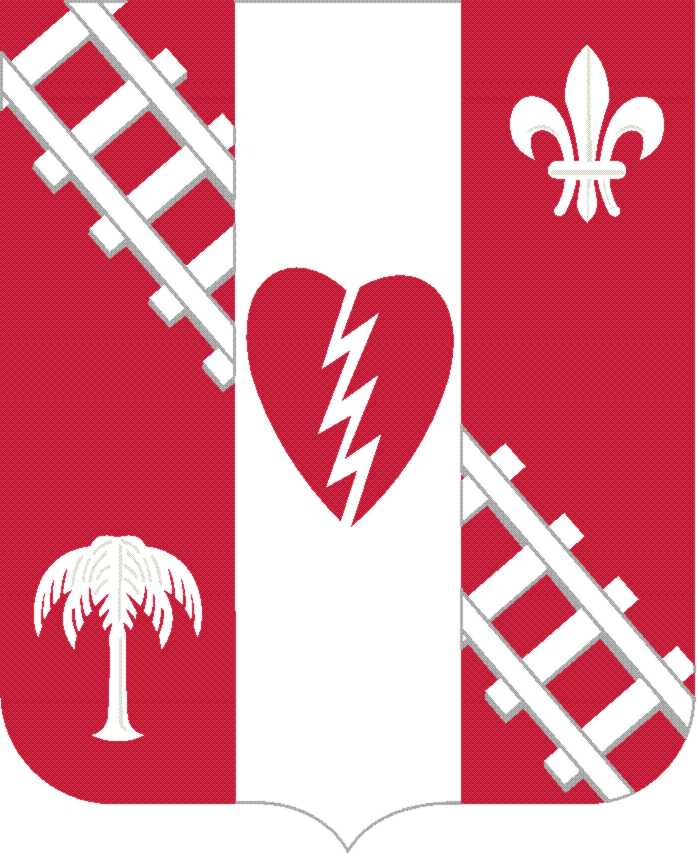
44th Engineer Battalion
"Builders of Freedom"

46th Engineer Battalion
"To Achieve"

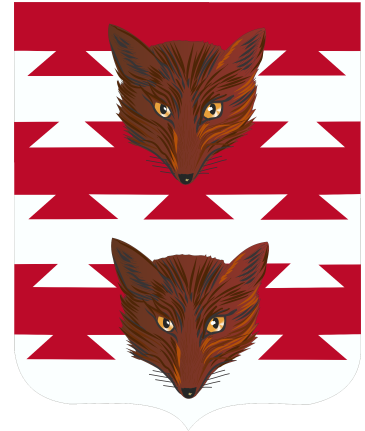
47th Engineer Battalion
"Ingenium Superat Vires" (Genius Surpasses Strength)

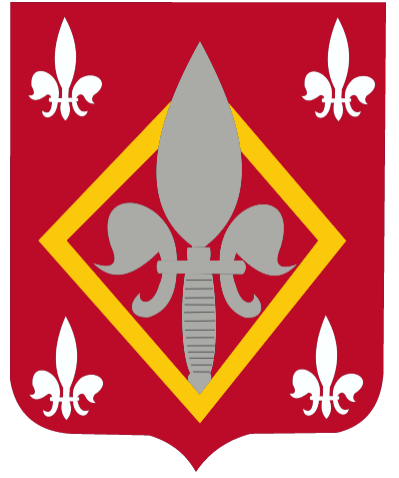
51st Engineer Battalion
"Stopped by Nothing"

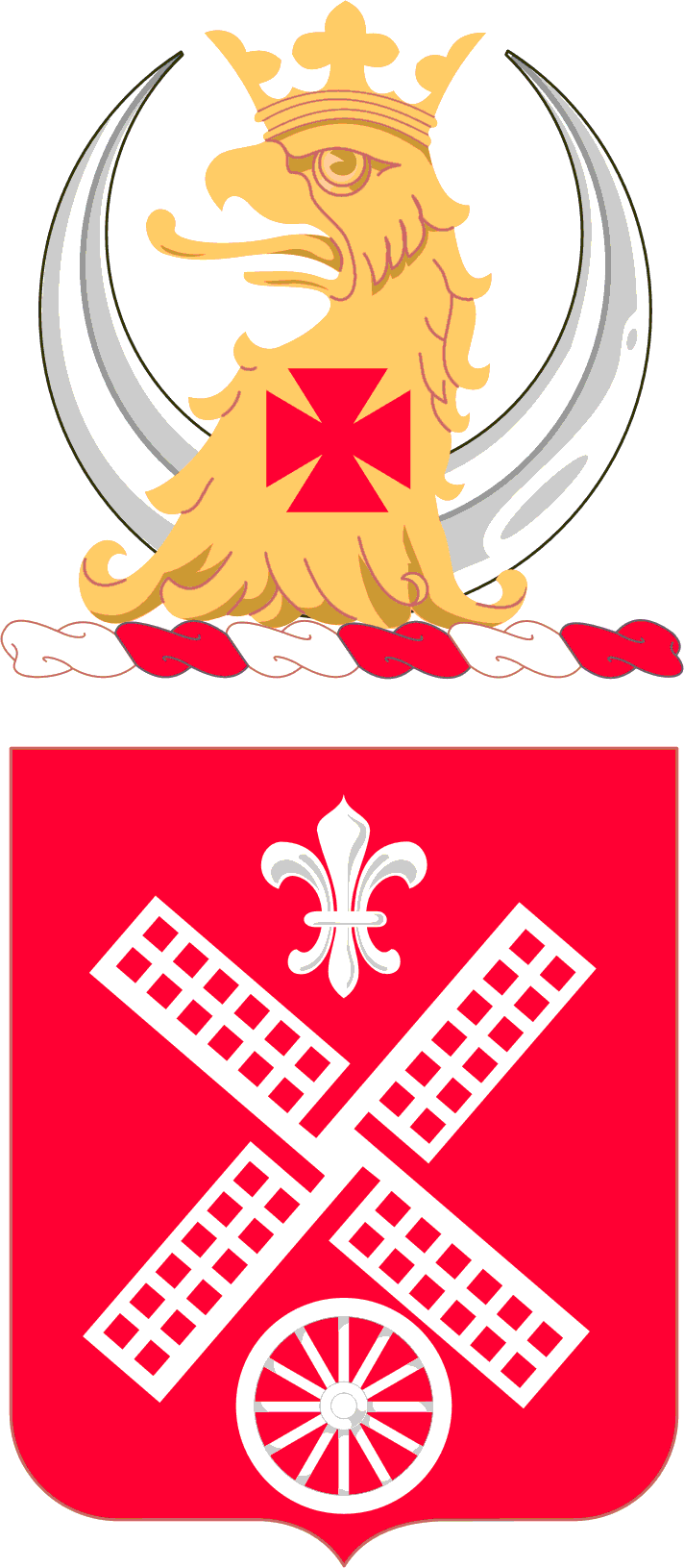
52nd Engineer Battalion
"Nous Servons" (We Serve)

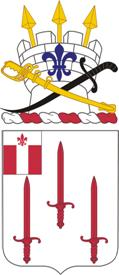
54th Engineer Battalion
"Essayons et Faisons" ((Let Us Try and Let Us Do)

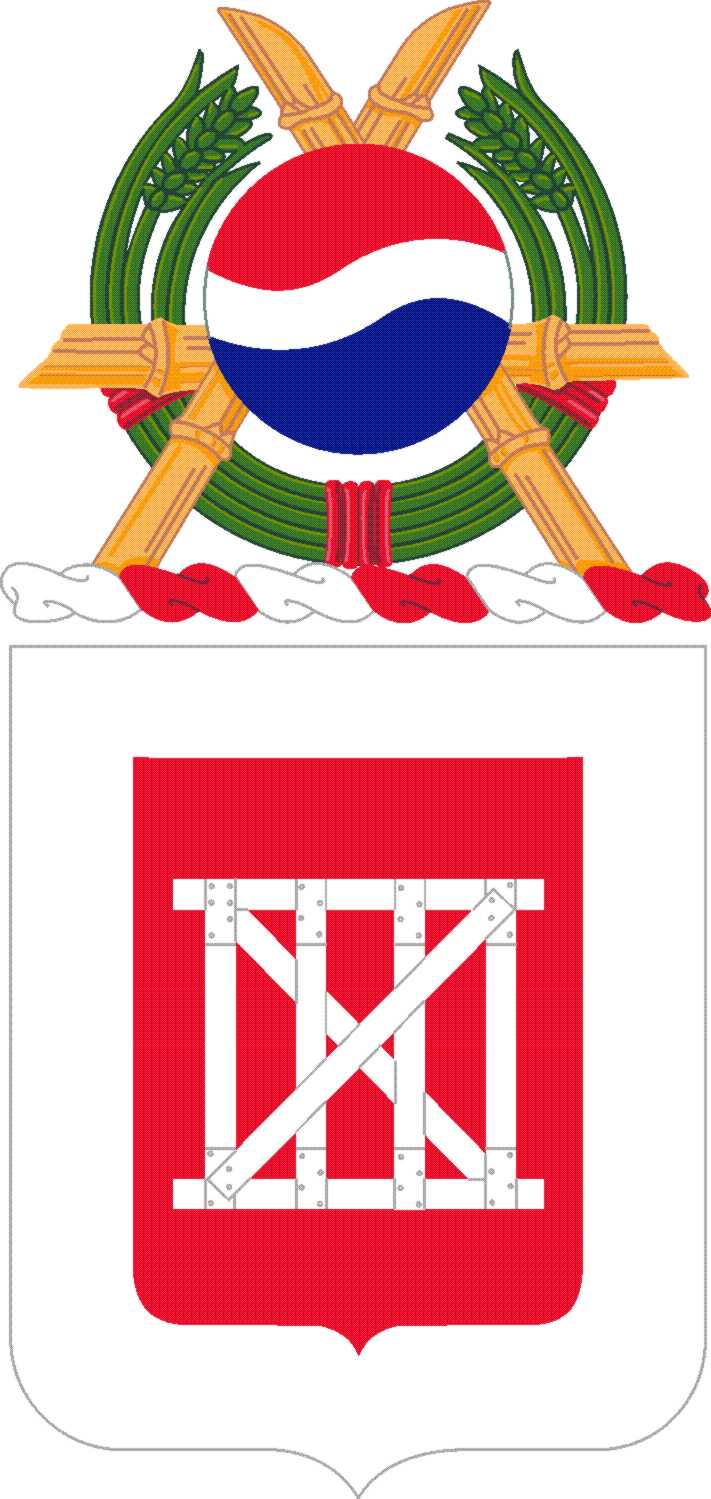
62nd Engineer Battalion
"Malleis Milito" (I Soldier with a Hammer)

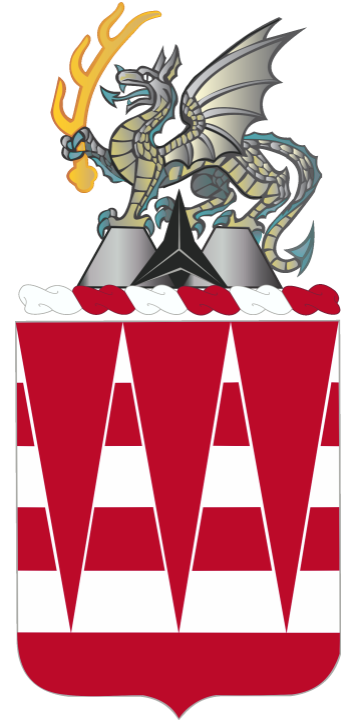
63rd Engineer Battalion
"Non Sine Industria" (Not Without Industry)

64th Engineer Battalion
(Coat of Arms not authorized)

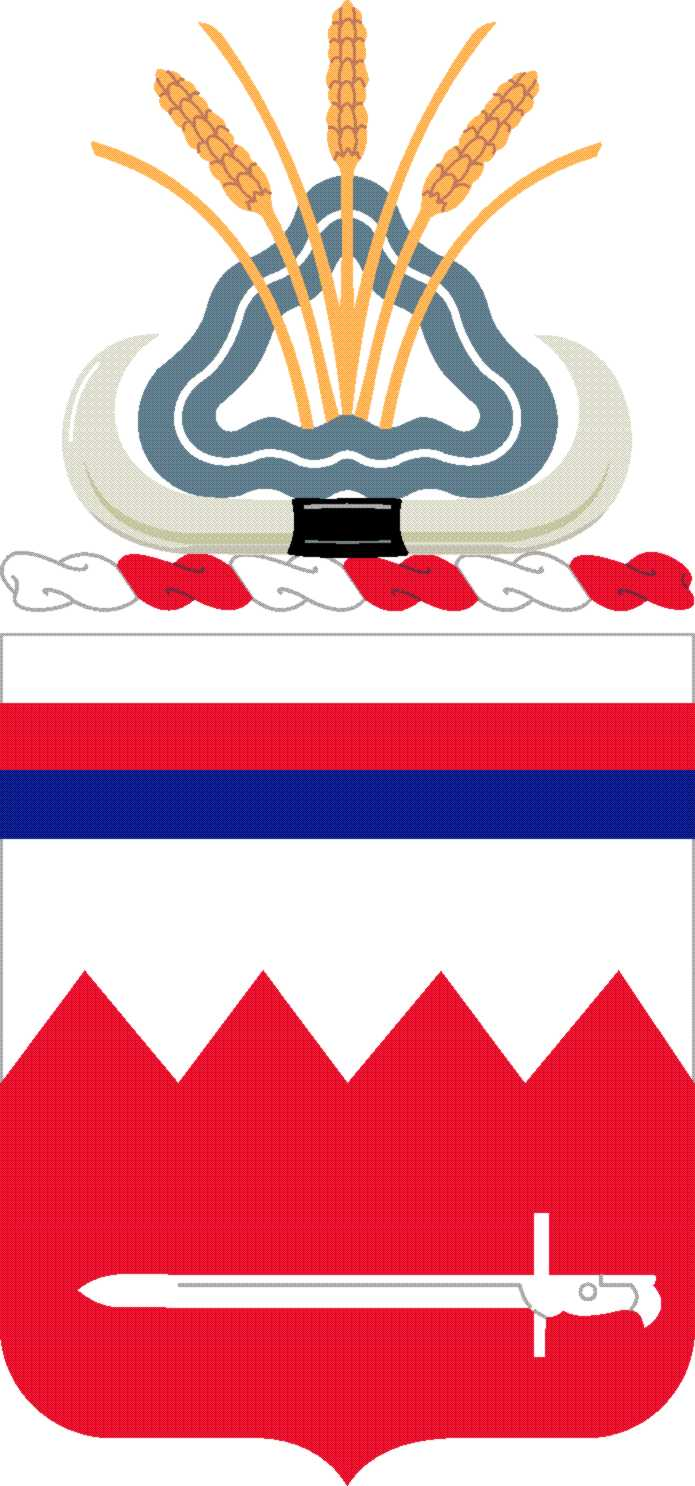
65th Engineer Battalion
"First In – Last Out"

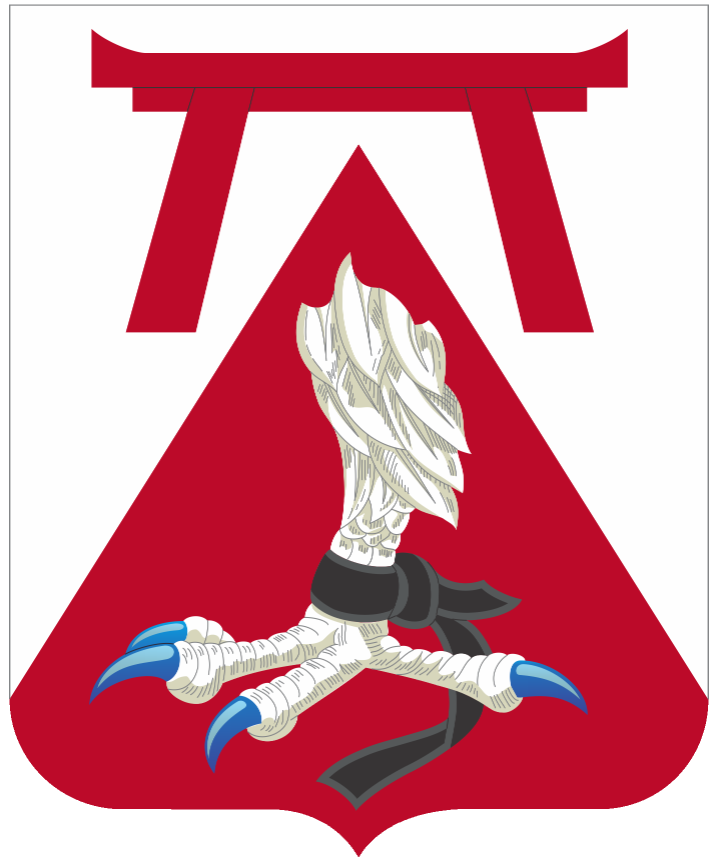
69th Engineer Battalion
"Builders for Peace"

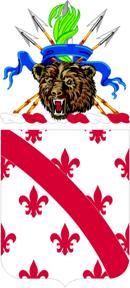
70th Engineer Battalion
"Valeur–Ingenuite" (Valor–Ingenuity)

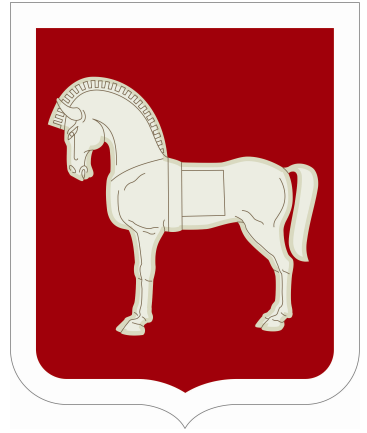
75th Engineer Battalion
"Vigilant et Ferme" (Vigilant and Firm)

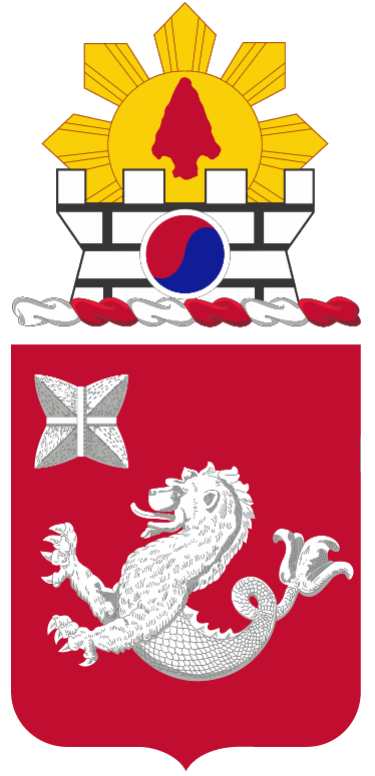
76th Engineer Battalion
"Laborare Est Vincere" (To Work Is To Conquer)

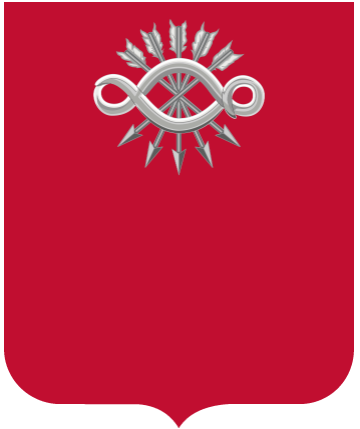
78th Engineer Battalion
"Sedulitate" (By Diligence)

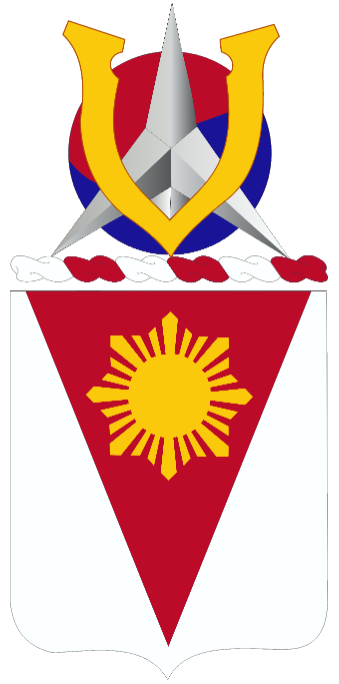
79th Engineer Battalion
"Fait Accompli" (It is Accomplished)

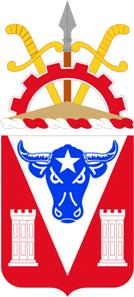
82nd Engineer Battalion
"Strength and Courage"

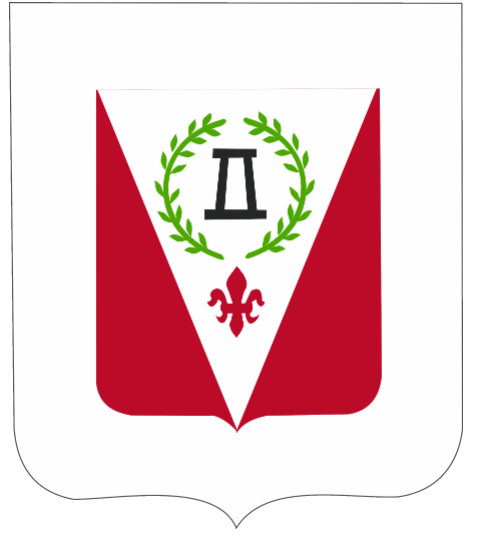
83rd Engineer Battalion
"Assigne Accomplirons" (Give Us The Job, We'll Do It)

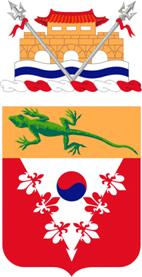
84th Engineer Battalion
"Never Daunted"

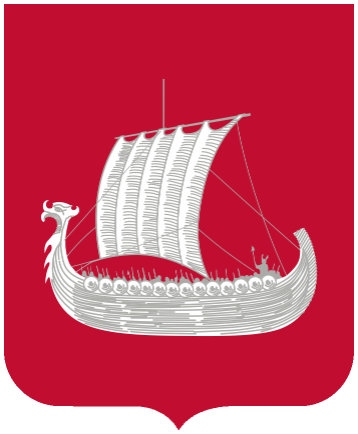
86th Engineer Battalion
"Pontifices Sumus" (We are Builders of Bridges)

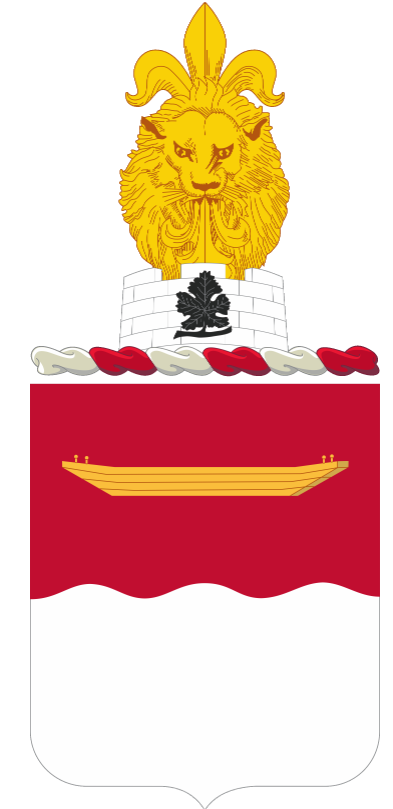
87th Engineer Battalion
"Lay Hold"

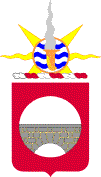
91st Engineer Battalion
"Acts Not Words"

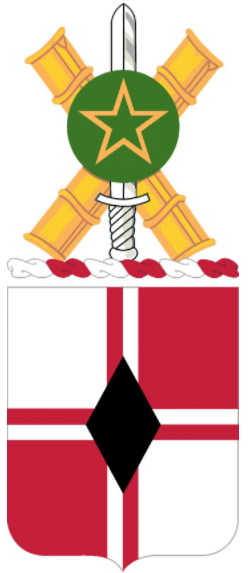
92nd Engineer Battalion
"Gloria Ad Caput Venire" (Glory in Achievement)

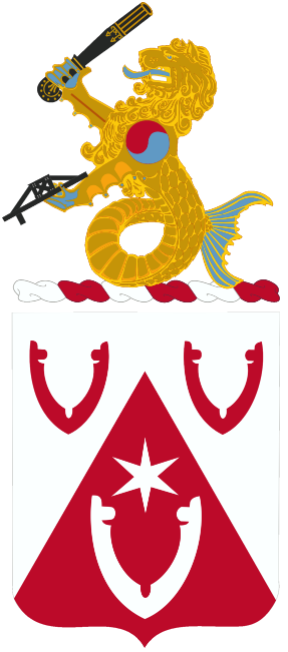
93rd Engineer Battalion
"Build with Pride"

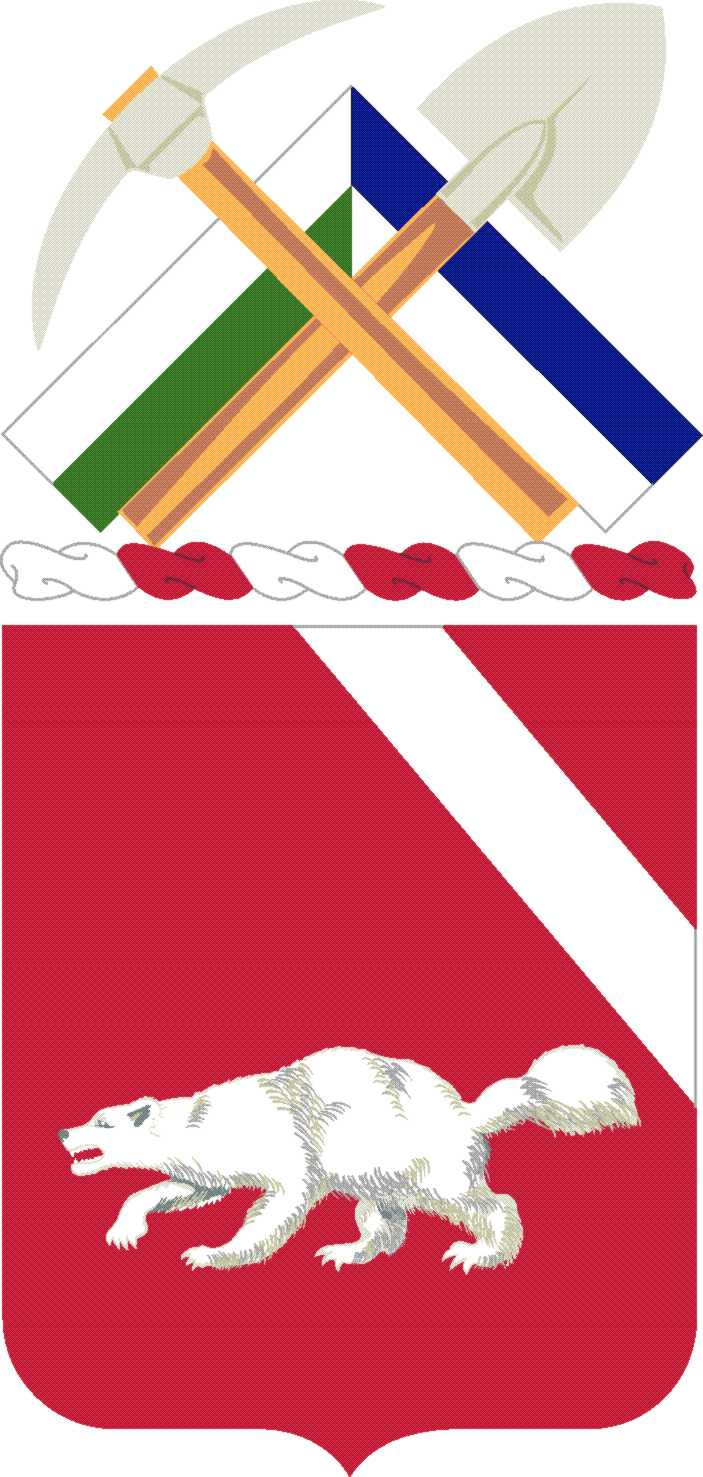
94th Engineer Battalion
"Cohortibus Auxilia" (Aid to any Division)

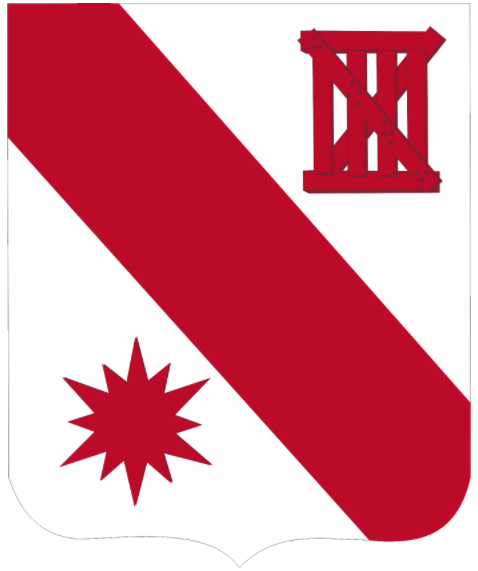
96th Engineer Battalion
"Ecce Signum" (Behold The Sign)

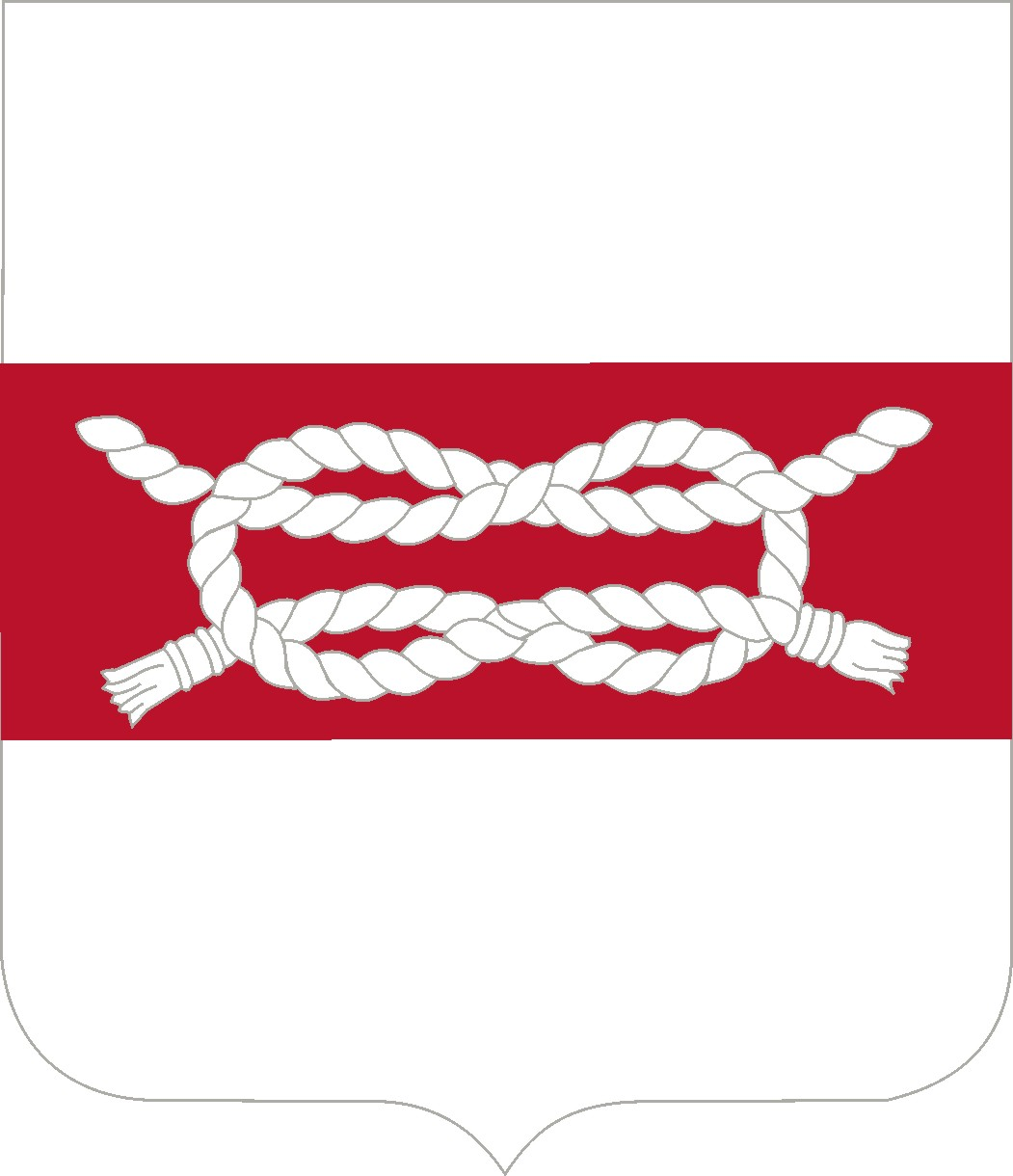
97th Engineer Battalion
"No Task Too Great"

=== 101 to 200 ===
101st Engineer Battalion
"Tenax Propositi" (Tenacious of Purpose)

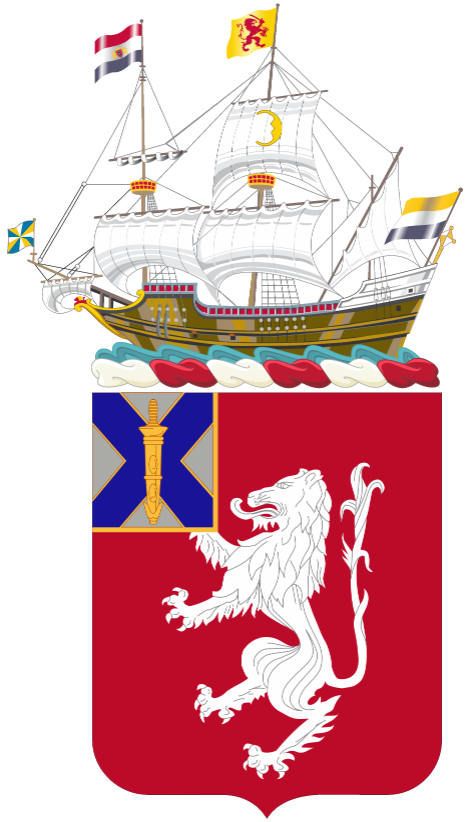
102nd Engineer Battalion
"Defendam" (May I Defend)

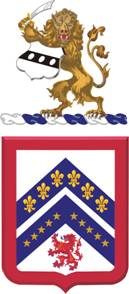
103rd Engineer Battalion
"Paratus" (Ready)

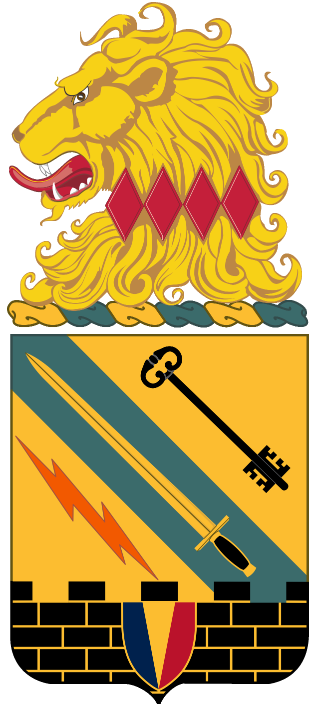
104th Engineer Battalion
(formerly 50th Brigade Special Troops Battalion)
"Innascor Bellum" (Born in War)

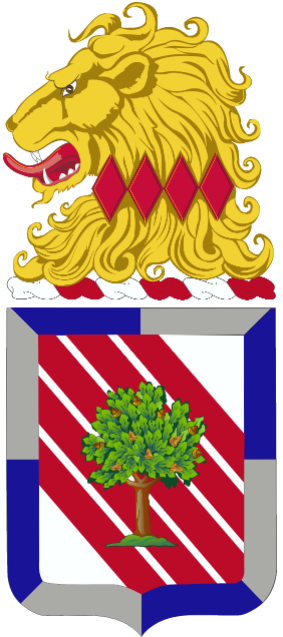
104th Engineer Battalion
(obsolete)
"Faciendum Est" (It Must Be Done)

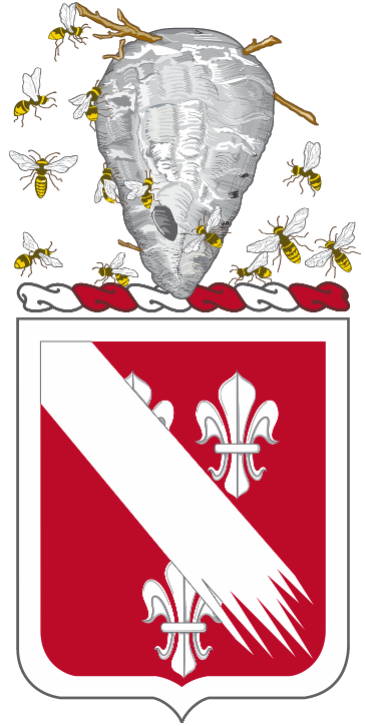
105th Engineer Battalion
"Conquer the Impossible"

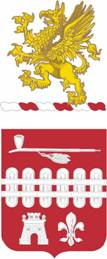
107th Engineer Battalion
"Good as Done"

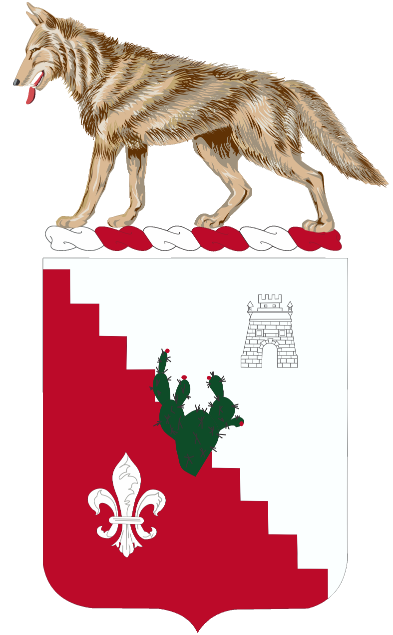
109th Engineer Battalion
"Allons Y Faire" (Let's Go Do It)

111th Engineer Battalion
"Dedicated And Diligent"

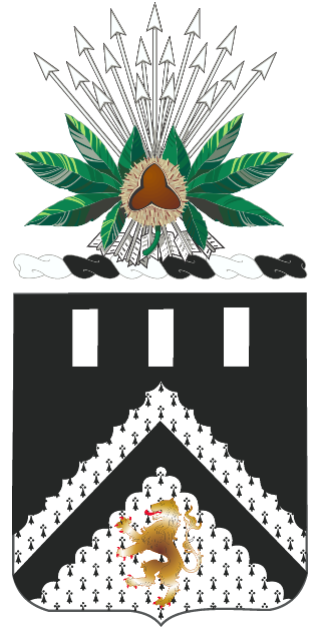
112th Engineer Battalion
"Bello Ac Pace Paratus" (Prepared in Peace and War)

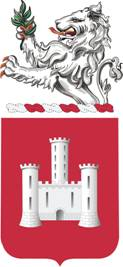
113th Engineer Battalion
"Service and Fidelity"

114th Engineer Battalion

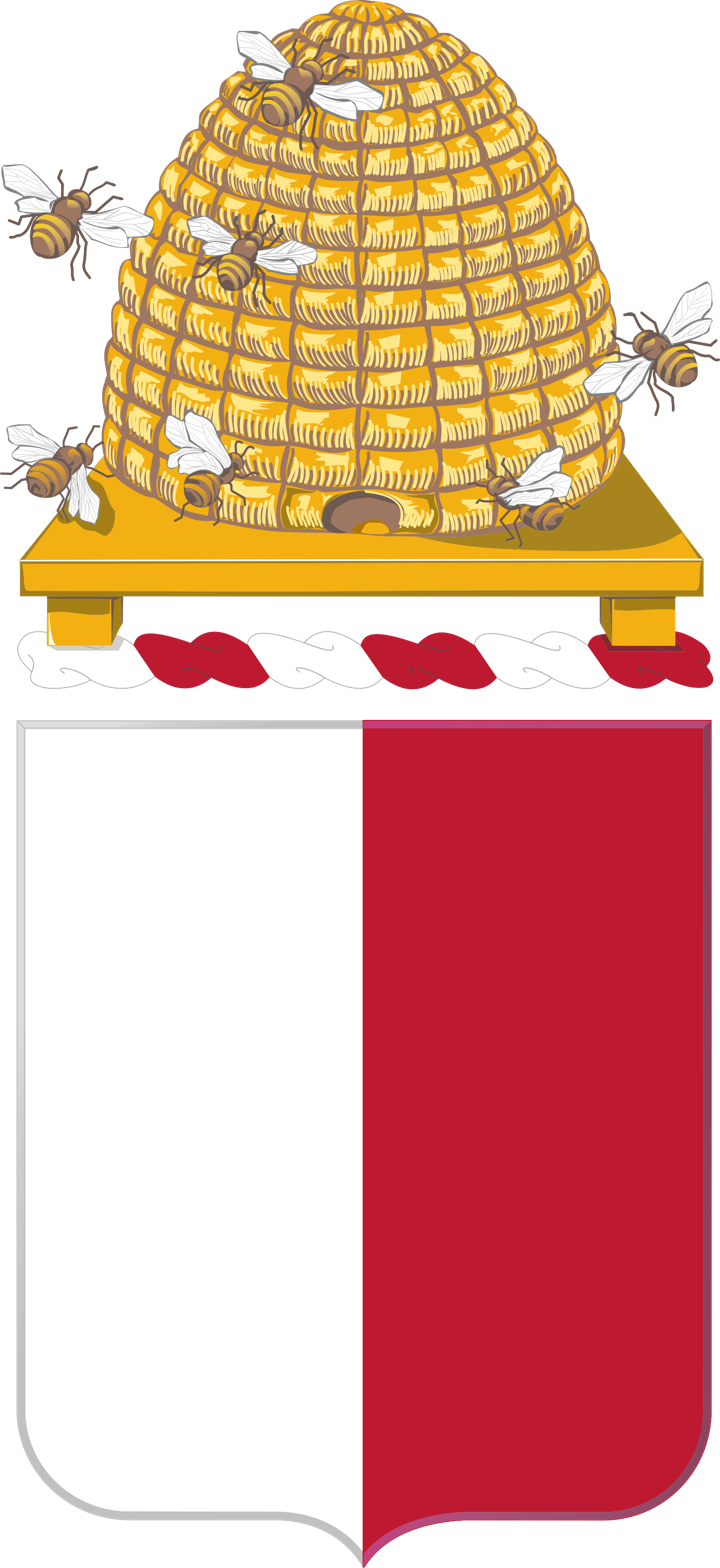
115th Engineer Battalion
"Bridge the Gap"

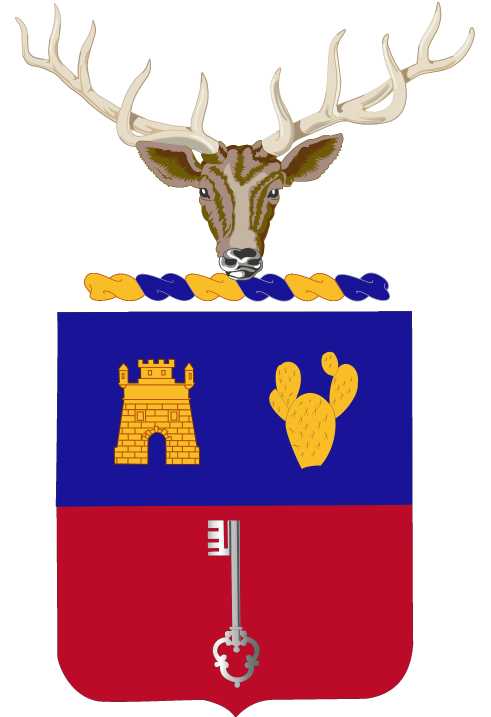
116th Engineer Battalion
"Prepare the Way"

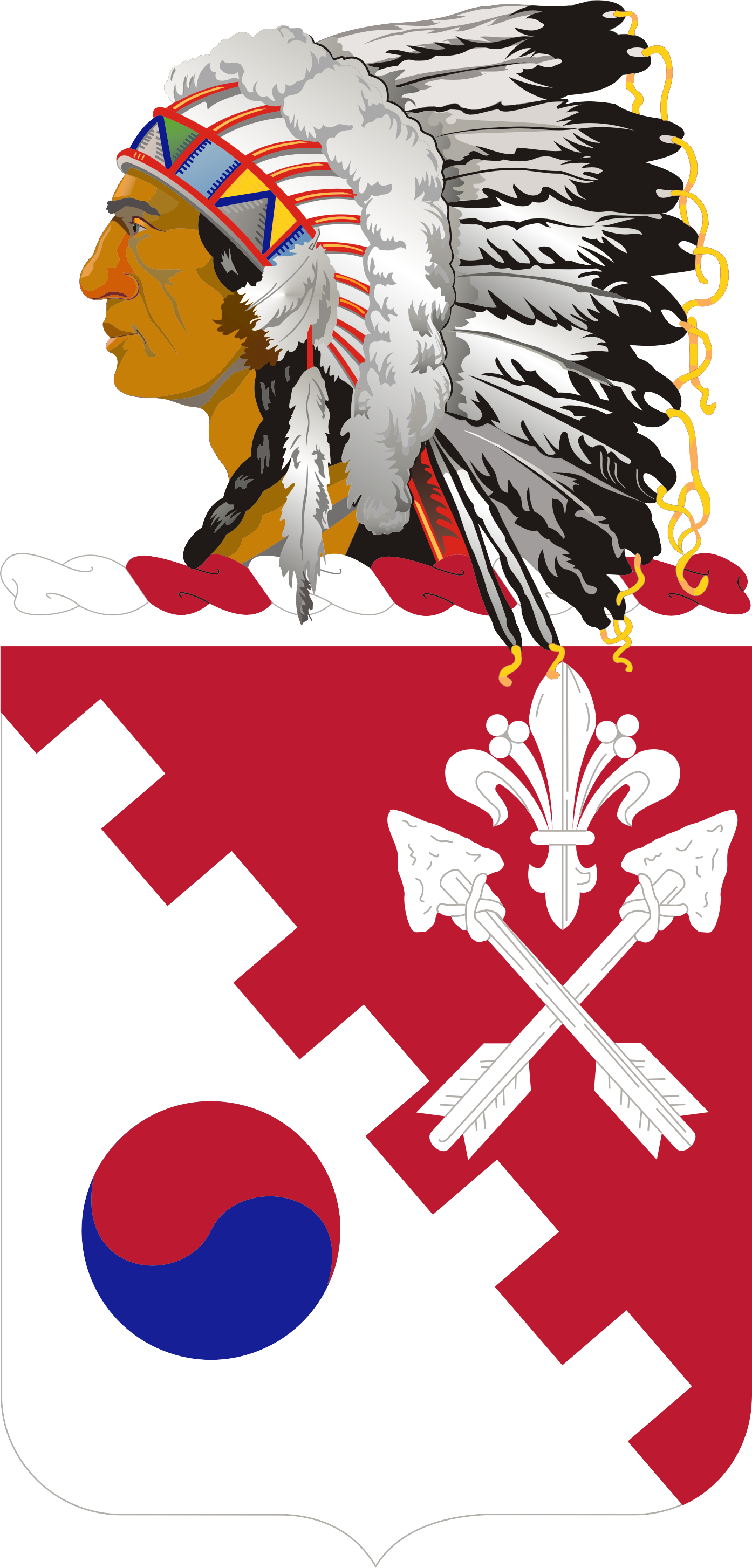
120th Engineer Battalion
"Never Idle"

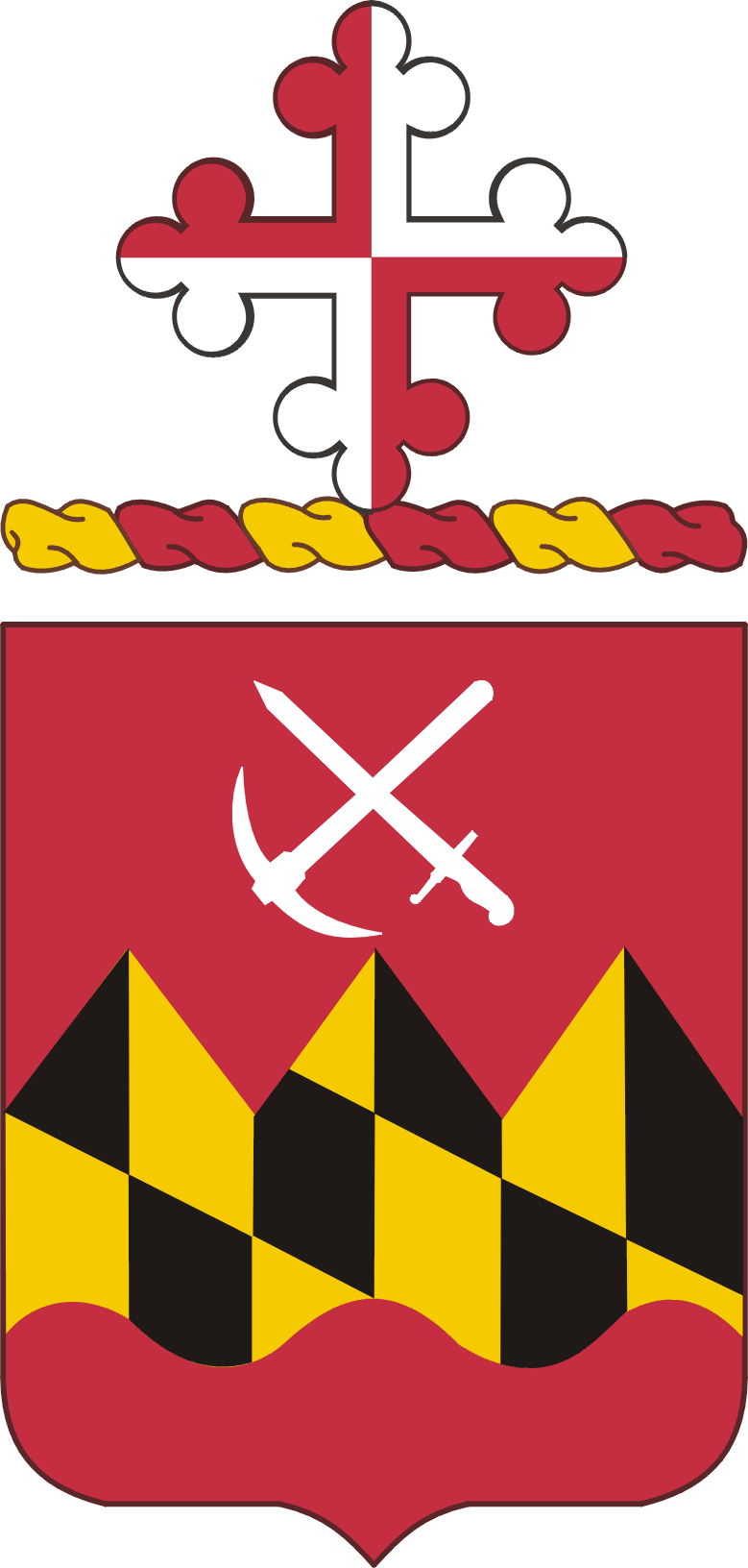
121st Engineer Battalion
"Praevius" (Going Before)

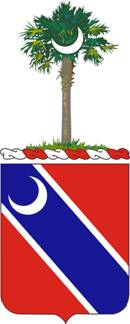
122nd Engineer Battalion
"Ad Caput Venire" (To Bring To An End [Successfully])

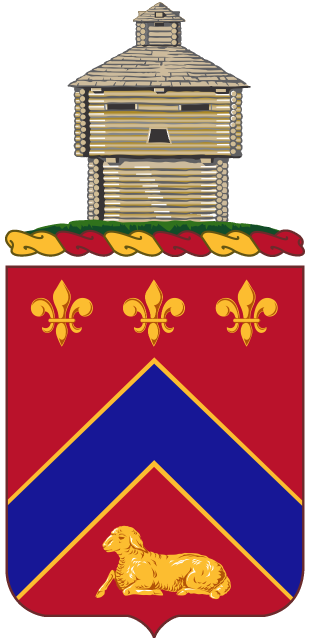
123rd Engineer Battalion
(formerly 123rd Field Artillery)
"Parati et Volentes" (Ready and Willing)

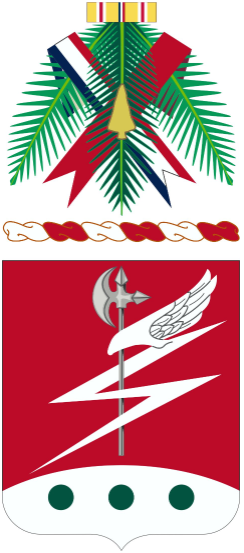
127th Engineer Battalion
"That Others May Follow"

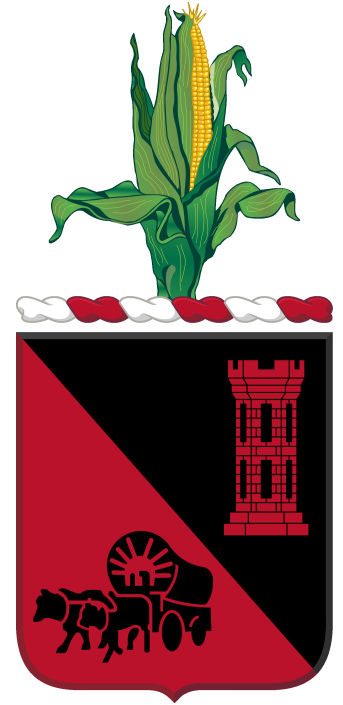
128th Engineer Battalion
"In Al Servitium" (Service above Self)

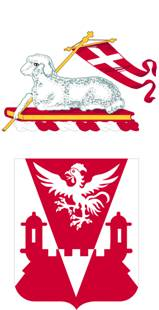
130th Engineer Battalion
"Skill and Strength"

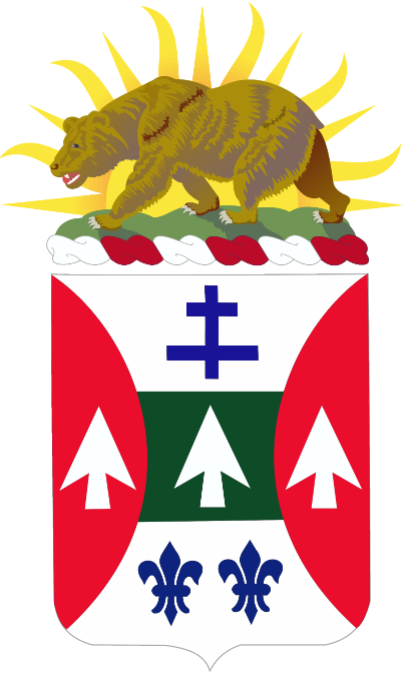
132nd Engineer Battalion
"Adeificamus Ducimus" (We Build, We Lead)

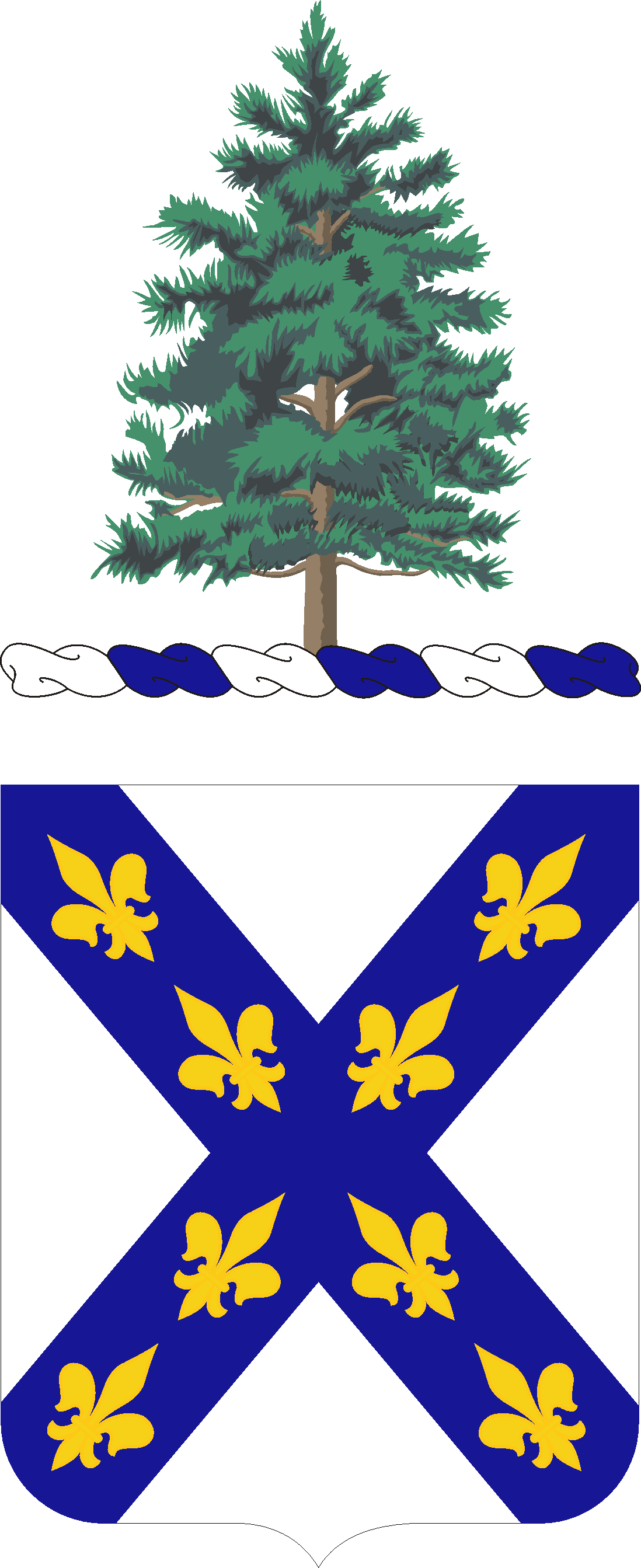
133rd Engineer Battalion
(formerly 103rd Infantry, 103rd Armored Cavalry, and 20th Armor)
"To the Last Man"

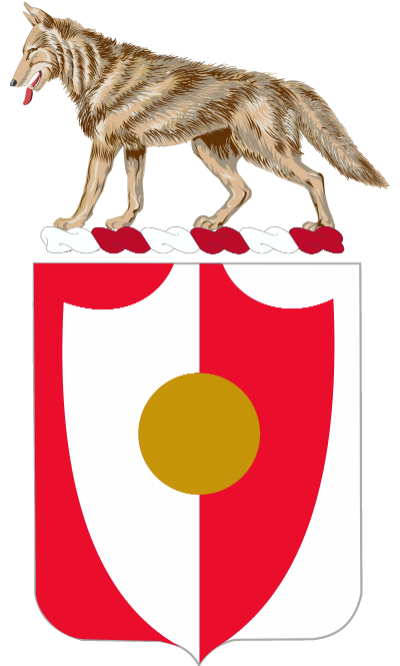
137th Engineer Battalion
"Quam Maximis Itineribus" (With the Utmost Possible Speed)

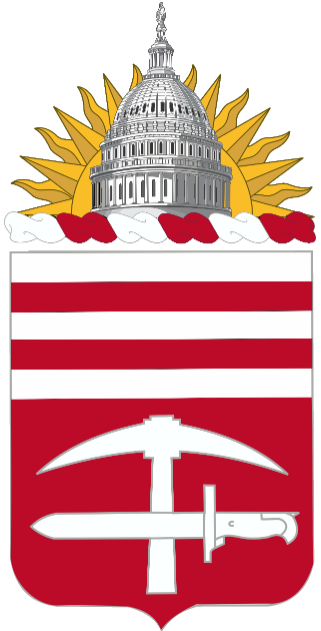
140th Engineer Battalion
"Faisons" (Let's Do)

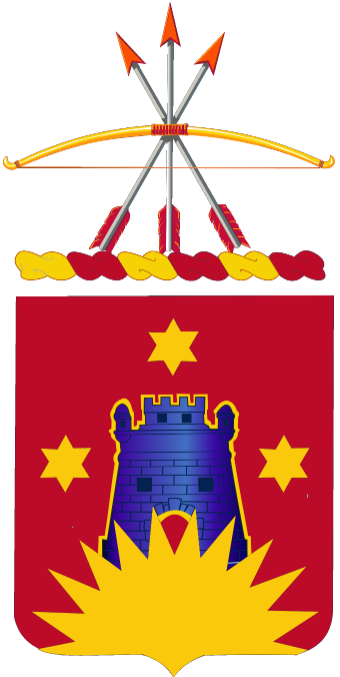
141st Engineer Battalion
"Verba Pauca – Multa Facta" (Our Words Are Few – Our Accomplishments Many)

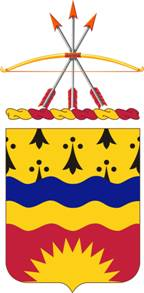
142nd Engineer Battalion
"This I'll Defend"

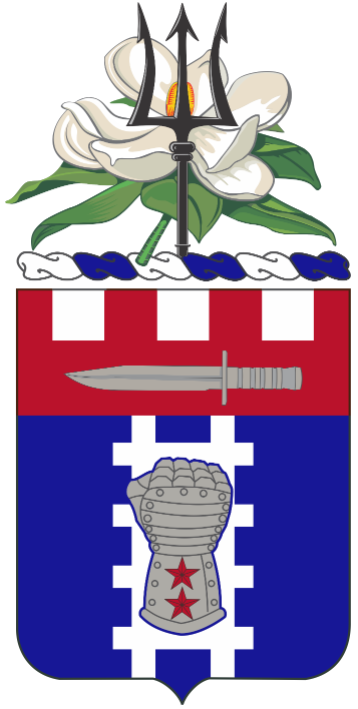
150th Engineer Battalion
(formerly 155th Brigade Special Troops Battalion)
"Honor is Our Strength"

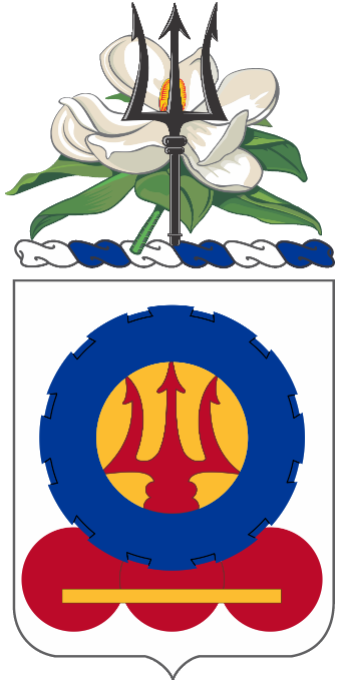
150th Engineer Battalion
(obsolete)
"Mobile, Agile, Flexible"

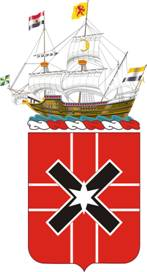
152nd Engineer Battalion
"Speed the Advance"

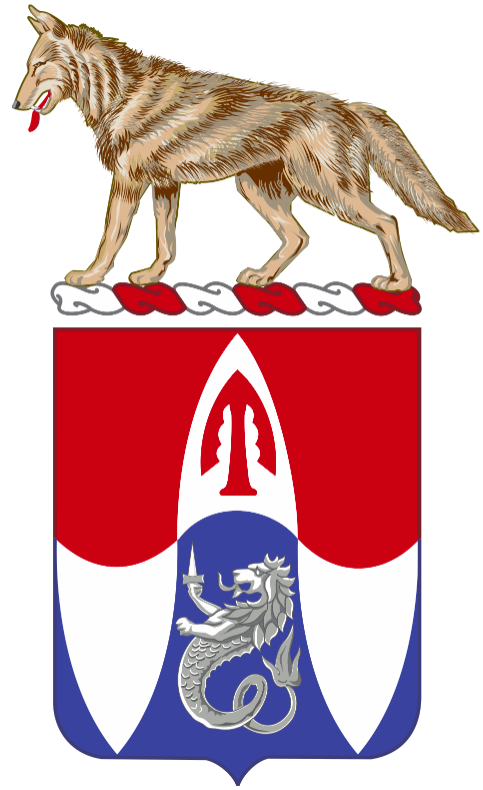
153rd Engineer Battalion
"Quod Faciendum" (What Is To Be Done)

156th Engineer Battalion
"Ex Magno Ad Maximus" (Great To Greatness)

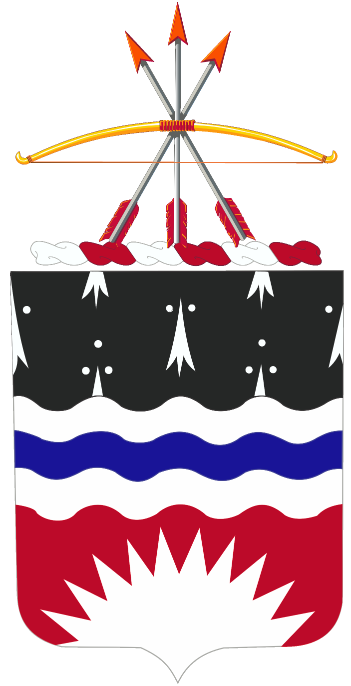
164th Engineer Battalion
"Okicize El Wakagapi" (Builders in Battle)

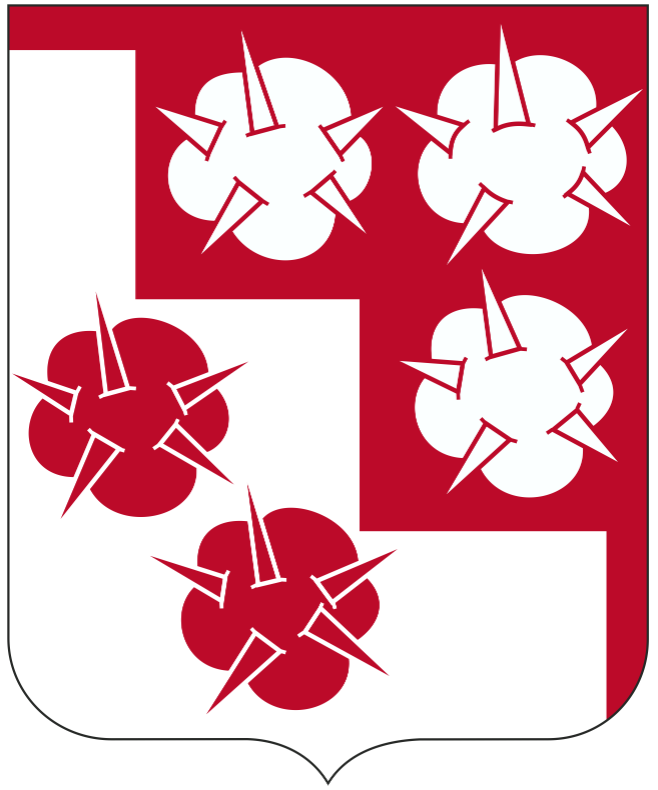
168th Engineer Battalion
"Assistance to All"

169th Engineer Battalion
"Mind and Hand"

172nd Engineer Battalion
(formerly 72nd Brigade Special Troops Battalion)
"Pugna Prout Unus" (Fight As One)

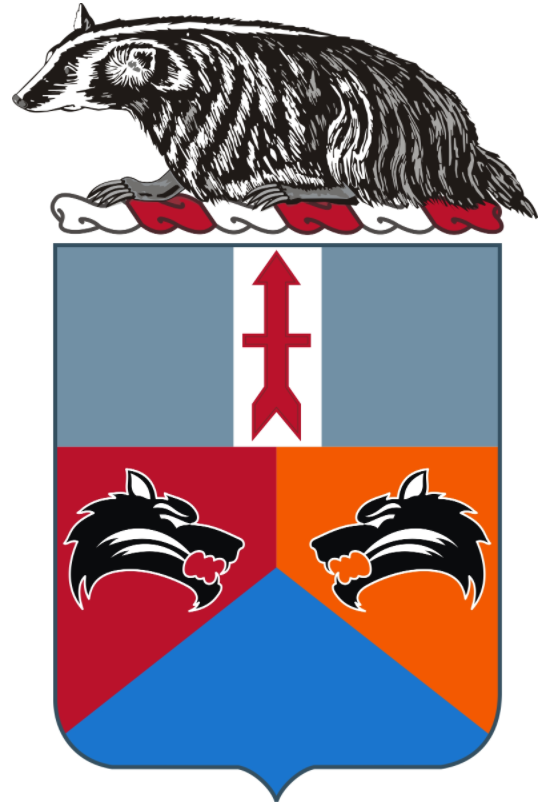
173rd Engineer Battalion
(formerly 32nd Brigade Special Troops Battalion)
"Pectus Pectoris Lupus" (Heart of the Wolf)

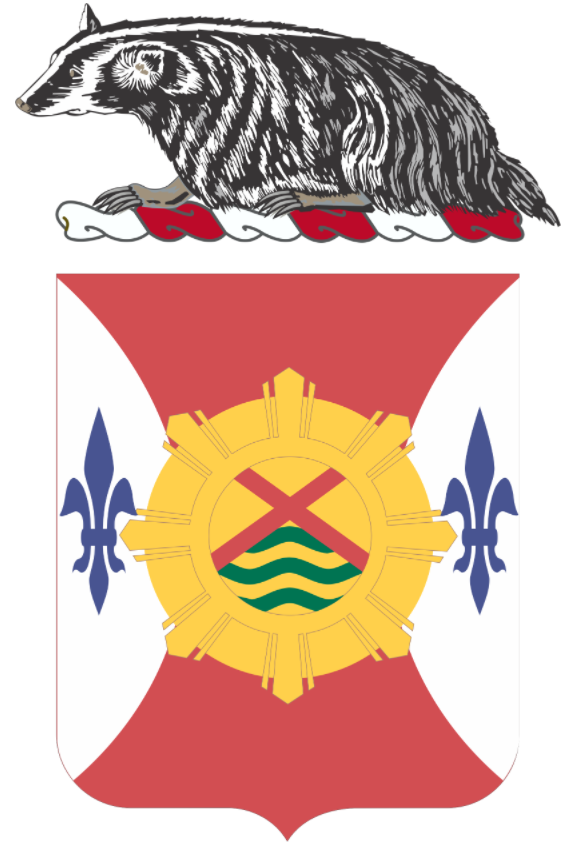
173rd Engineer Battalion
(obsolete)
"Soldiers of the Great River"

176th Engineer Battalion
"Ardua Vinco" (I Conquer Difficulties)

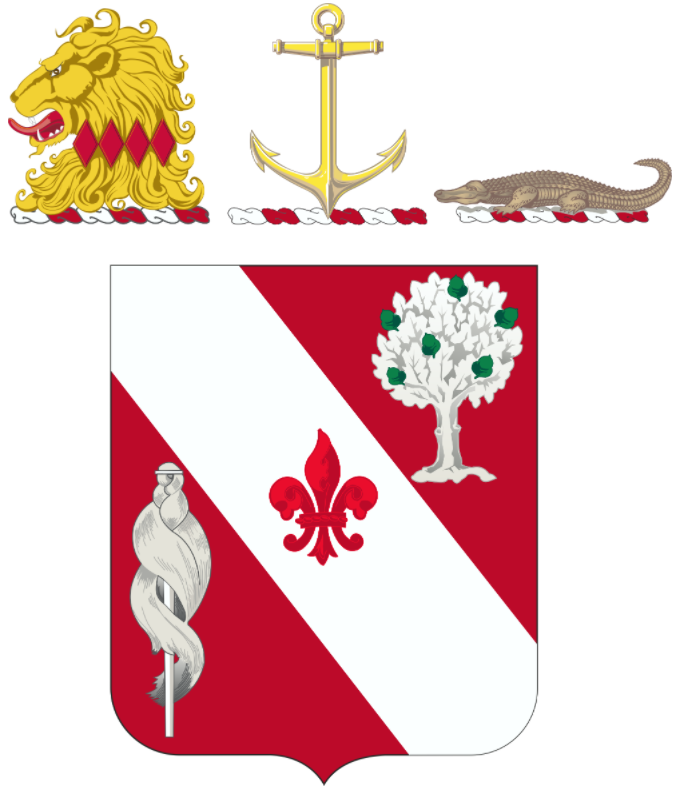
177th Engineer Battalion
"Strength and Skill"

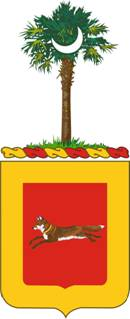
178th Engineer Battalion
"Ready, Sir!"

181st Engineer Battalion
"Minuteman Engineers"

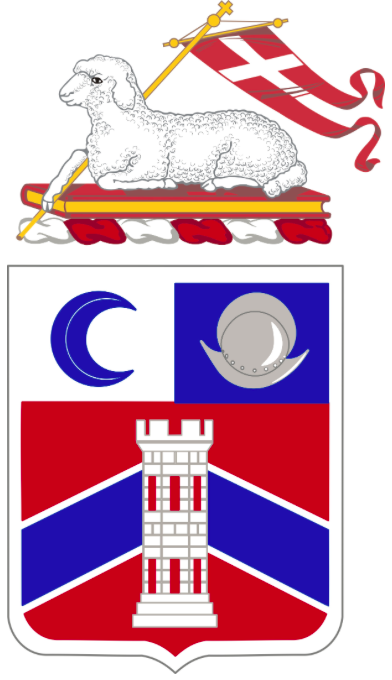
190th Engineer Battalion
"Acta non Verba" (Actions not Words)

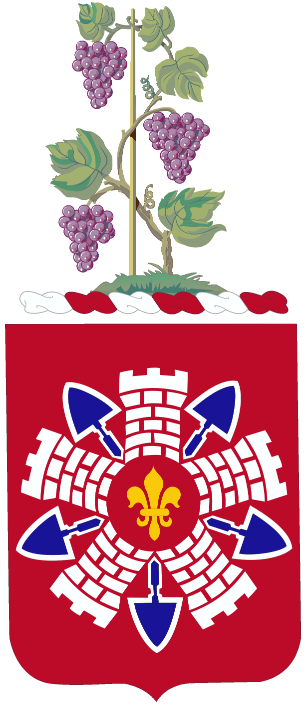
192nd Engineer Battalion
"Give Us the Tools"

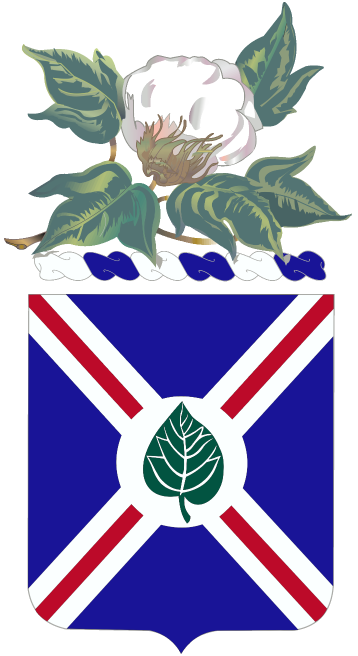
200th Engineer Battalion
"En Route" (On the Way)

=== 201 to 300 ===
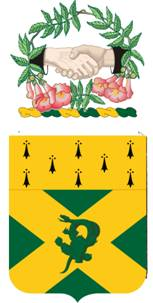
201st Engineer Battalion
"Libertatis Custodes" (Guardians of Liberty)

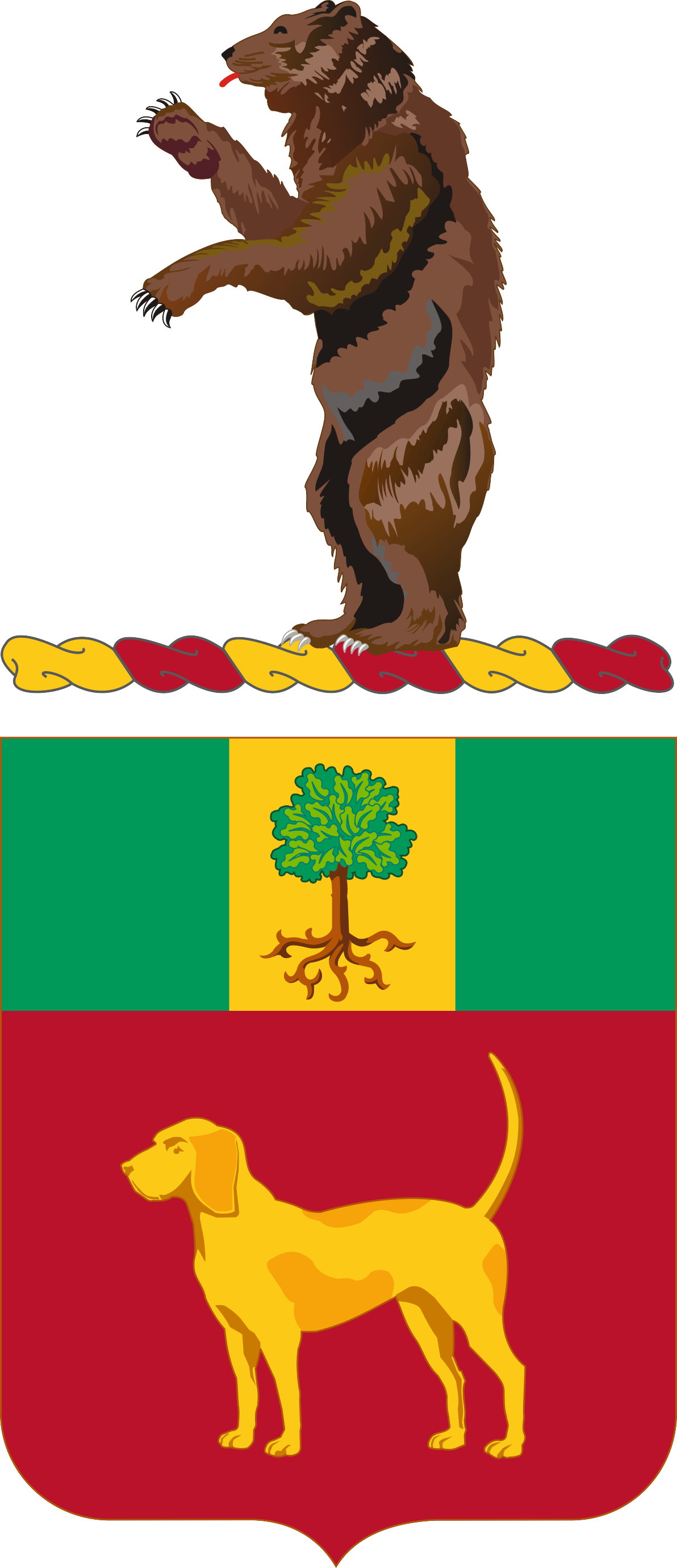
203rd Engineer Battalion
(formerly 203rd Coast Artillery & 203rd Armor)
"Don't Kick Our Dog"

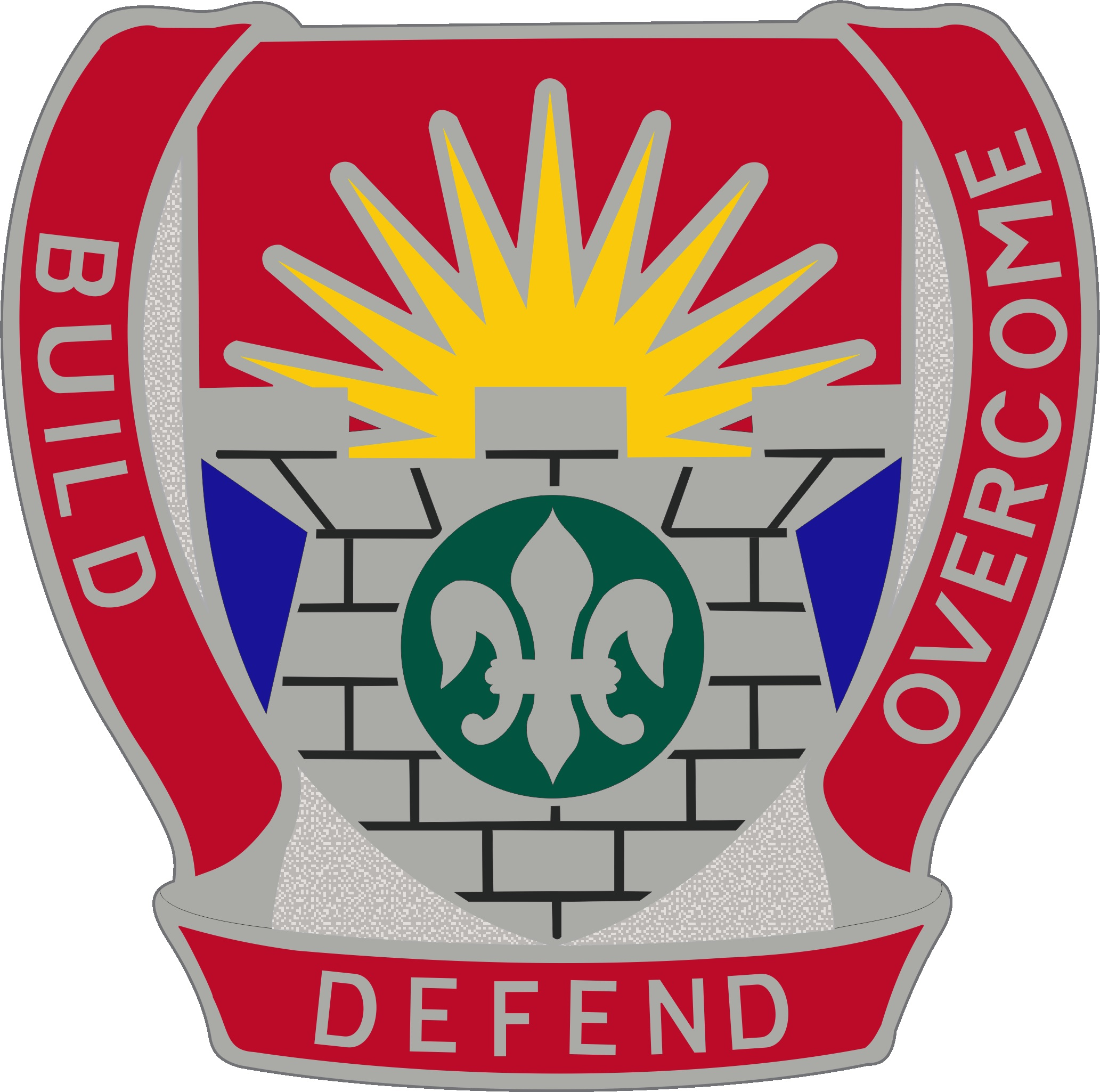
204th Engineer Battalion
"Build, Defend, Overcome"

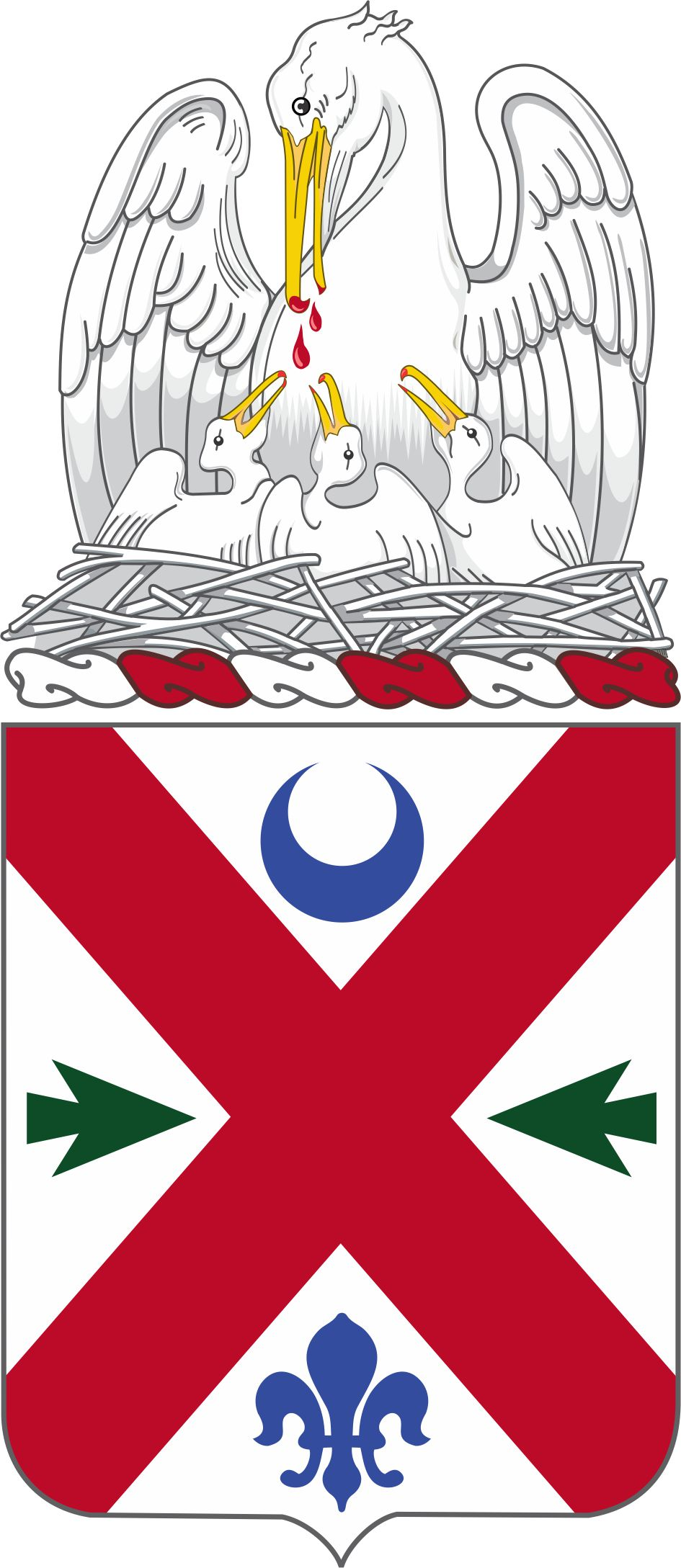
205th Engineer Battalion
"Come What Will"

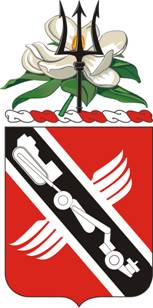
223rd Engineer Battalion
"Crescit Labore" (It Grows with Labor)

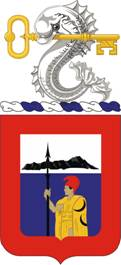
227th Engineer Battalion
"Ikaika Mau Loa" (Forever Strong)

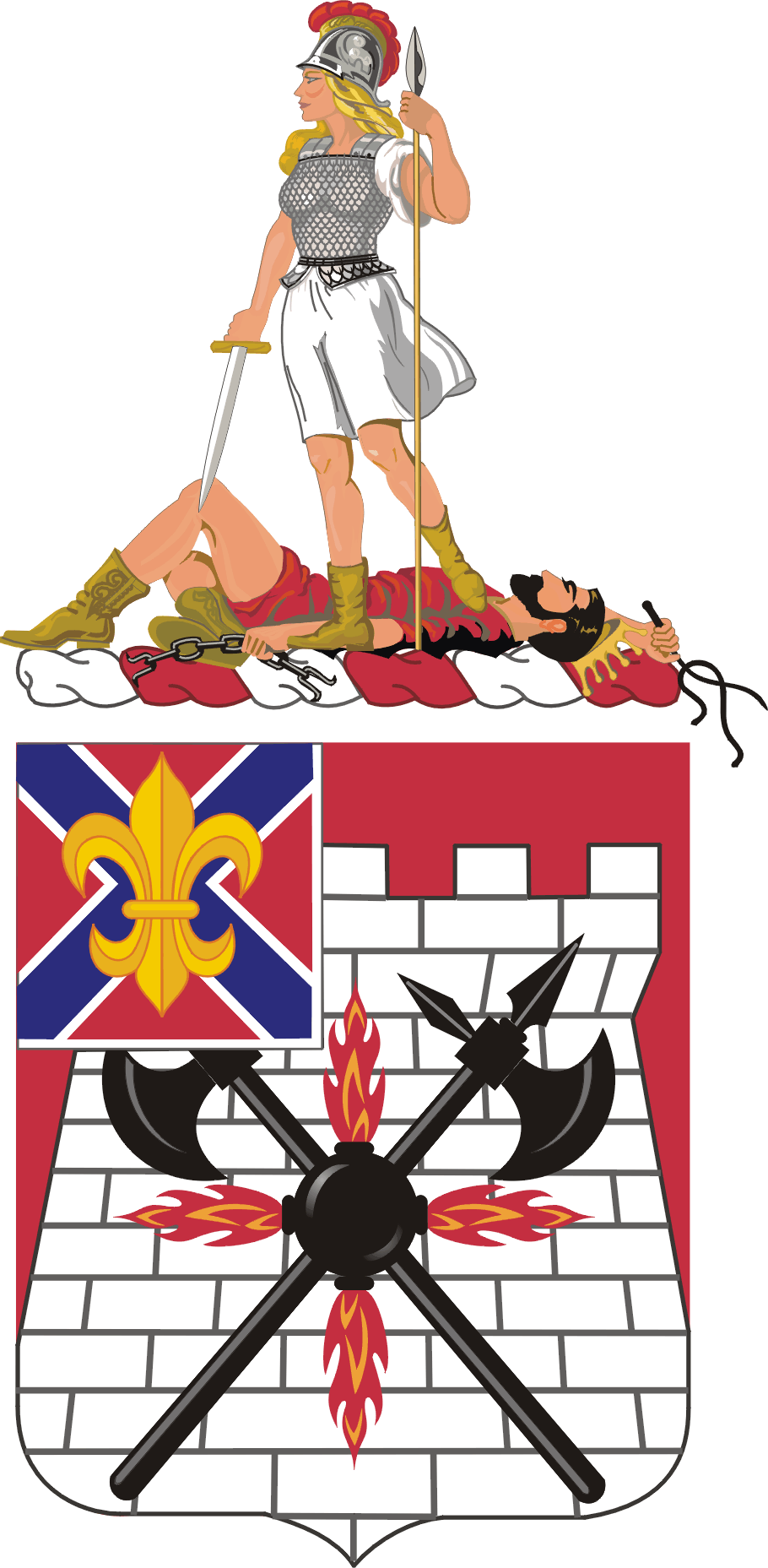
229th Engineer Battalion
(formerly 116th Brigade Special Troops Battalion)
"Sappers Lead"

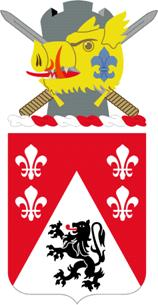
249th Engineer Battalion
"Build, Support, Sustain"

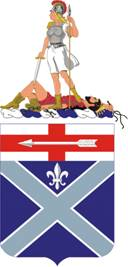
276th Engineer Battalion
"Liberty or Death"
"First Virginia"

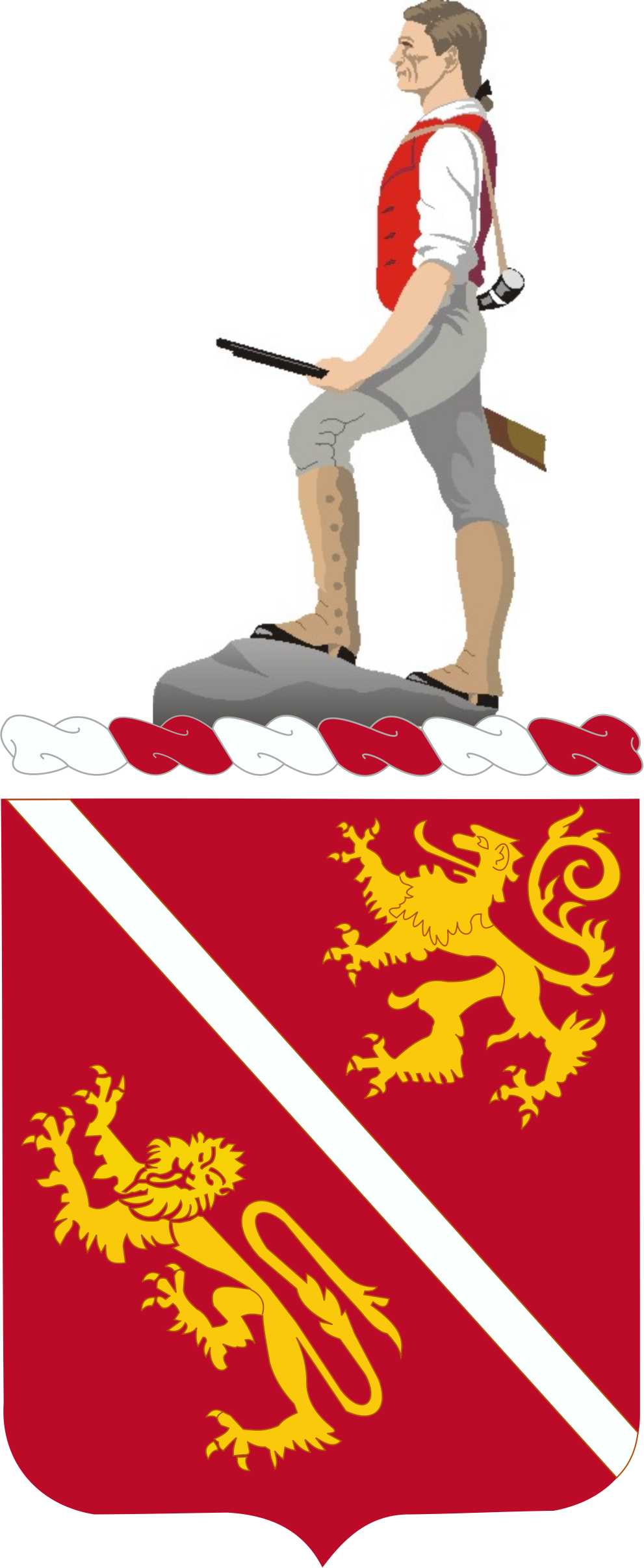
291st Engineer Battalion
"Laboramus Ad Muniendum" (We Work to Fortify)

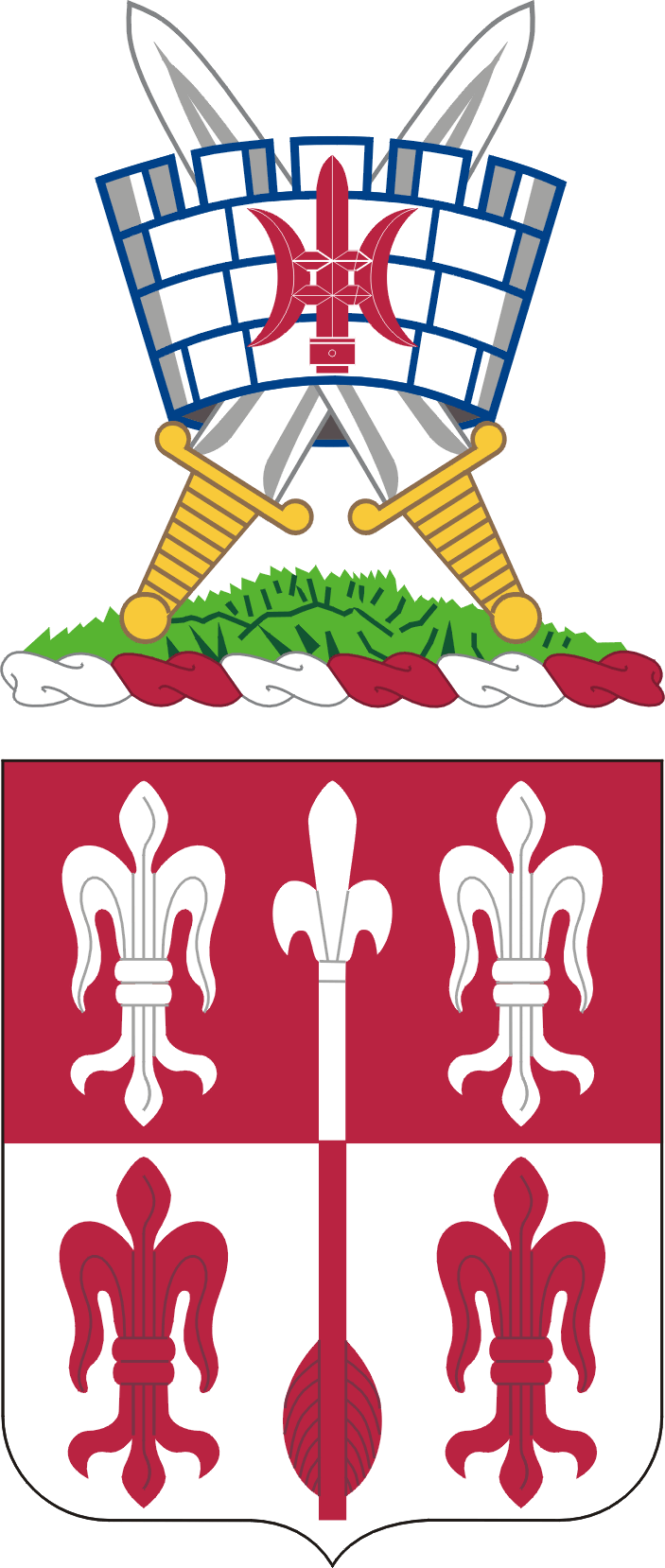
299th Engineer Battalion
"Proven Pioneers"

=== 300 to 544 ===
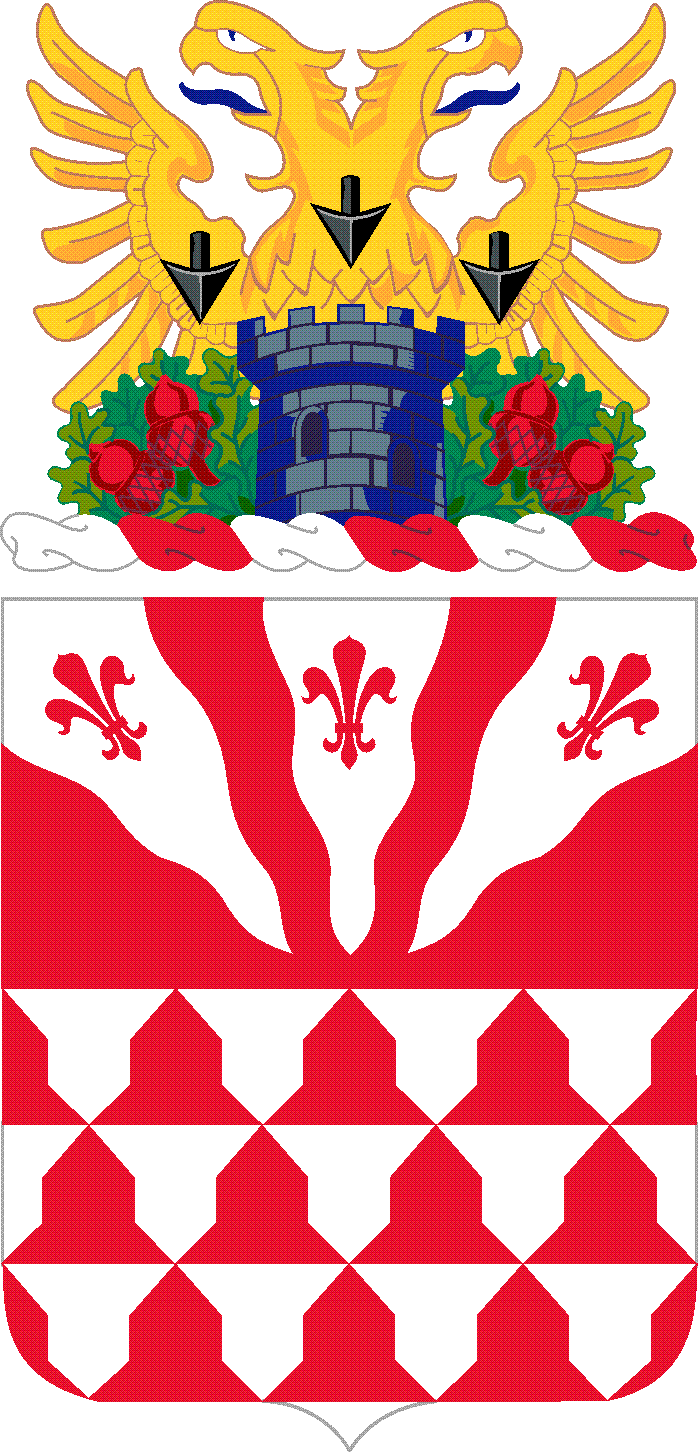
307th Engineer Battalion

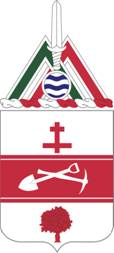
317th Engineer Battalion

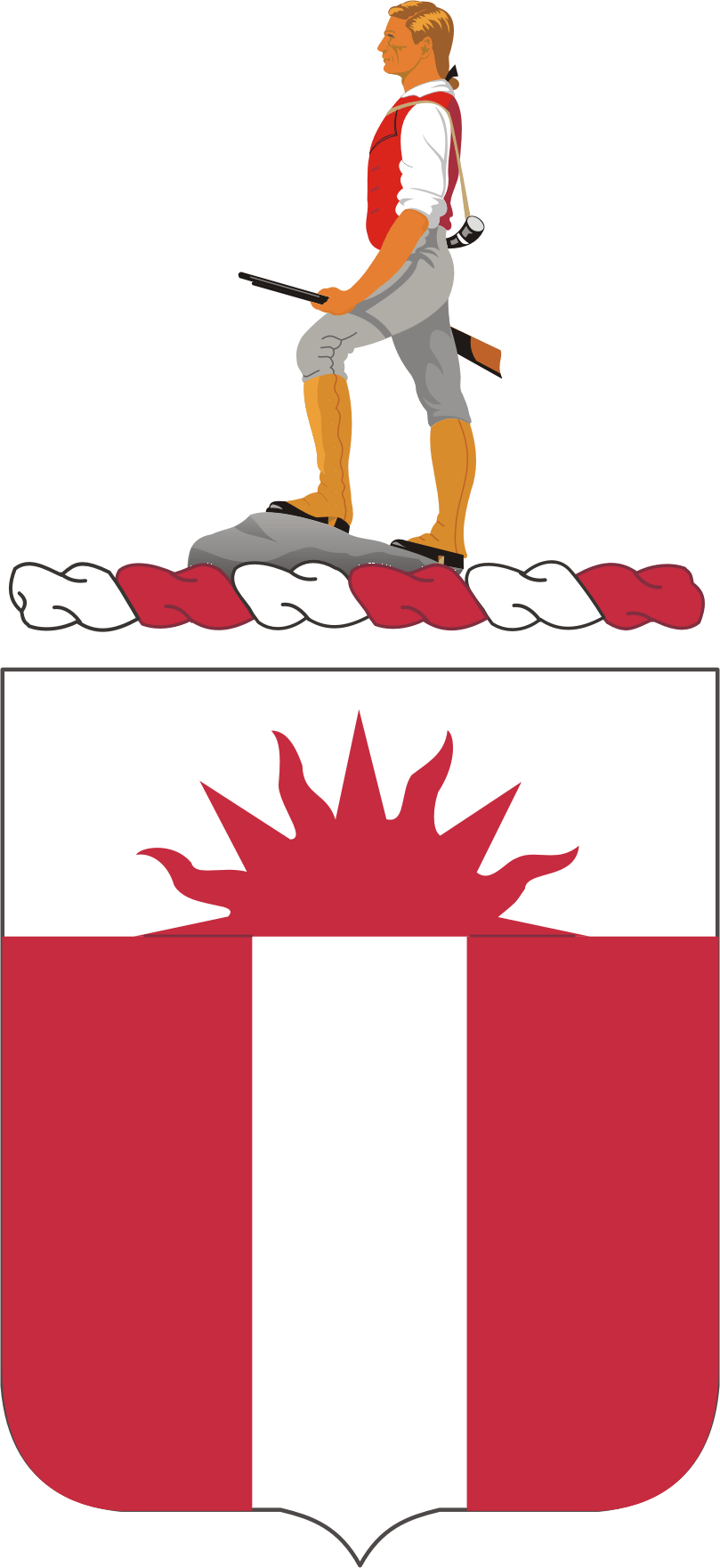
321st Engineer Battalion

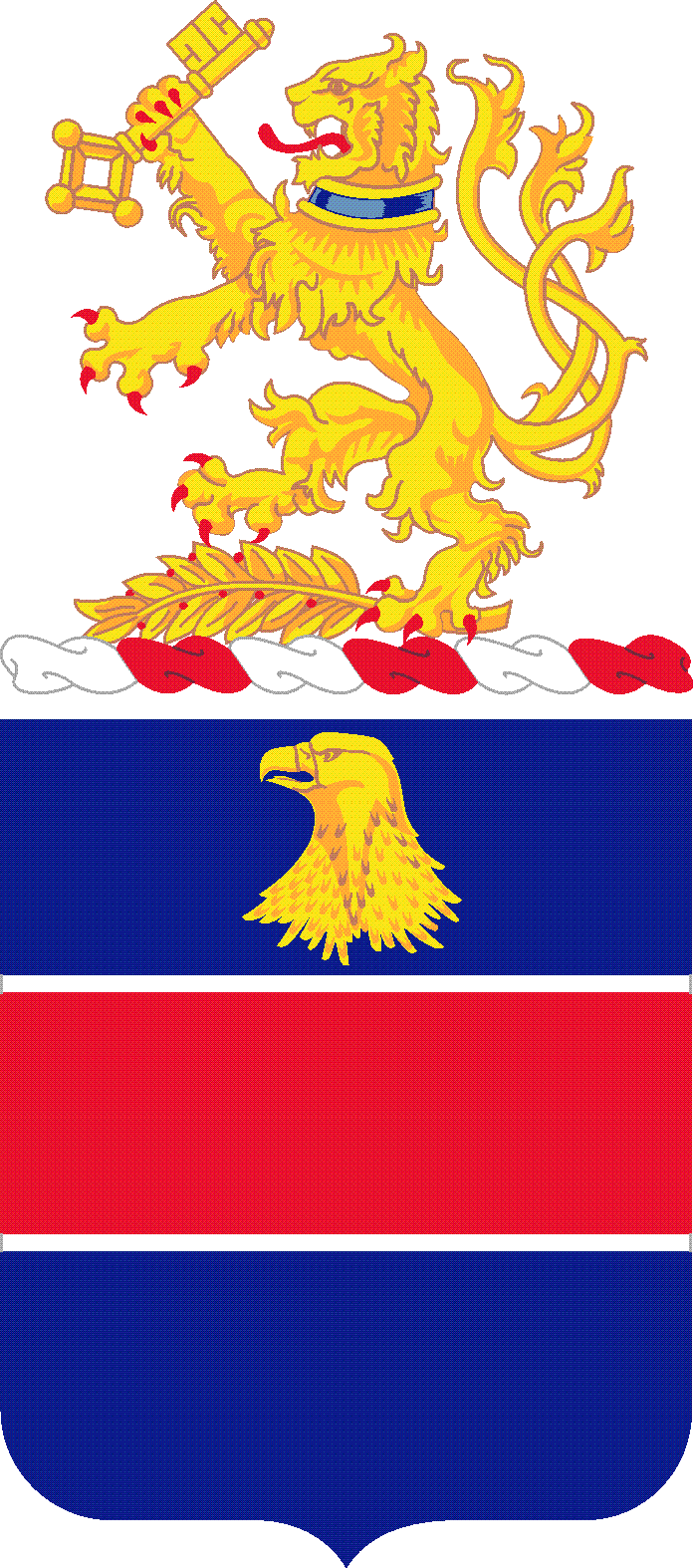
326th Engineer Battalion

337th Engineer Battalion

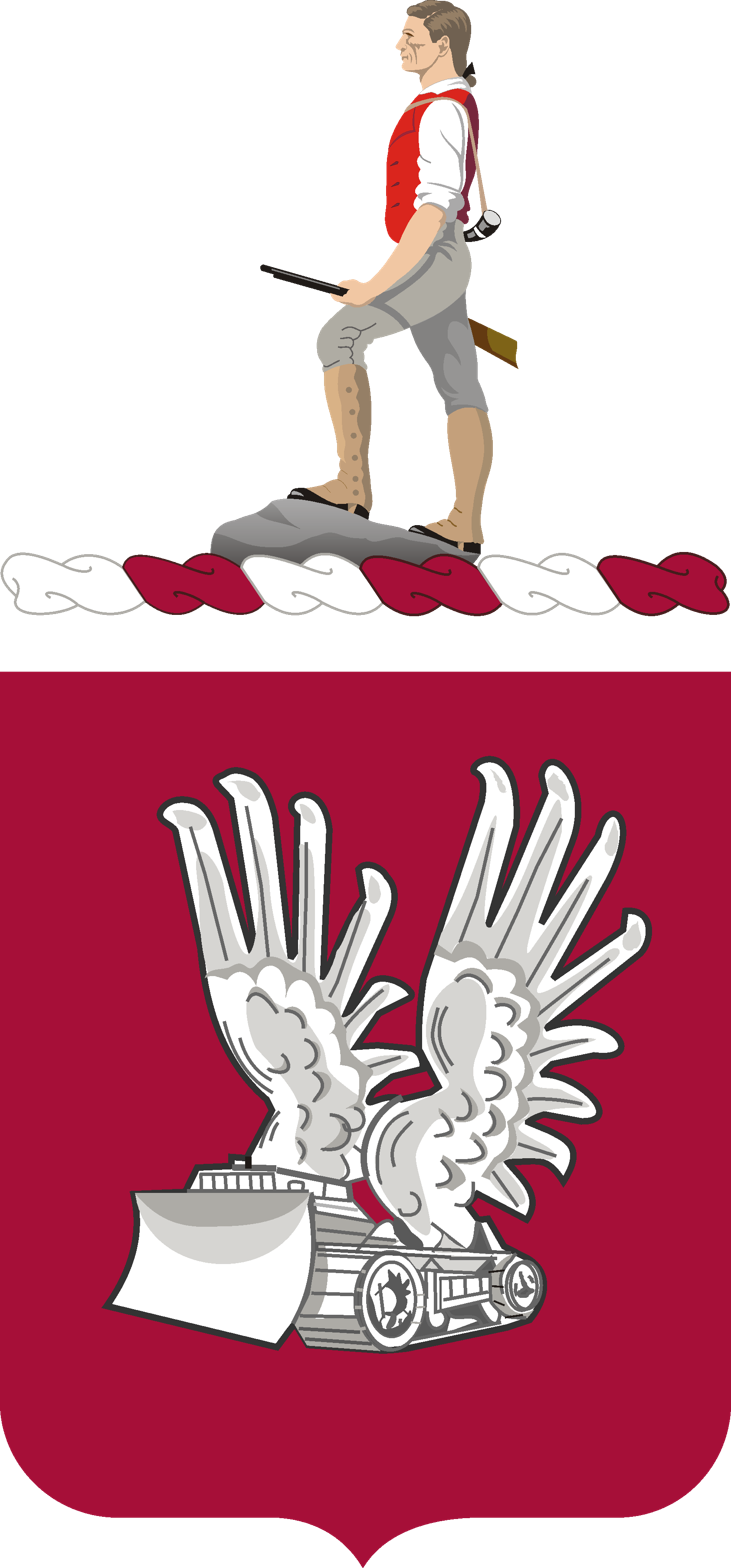
365th Engineer Battalion

386th Engineer Battalion
"Reinforce And Destroy"

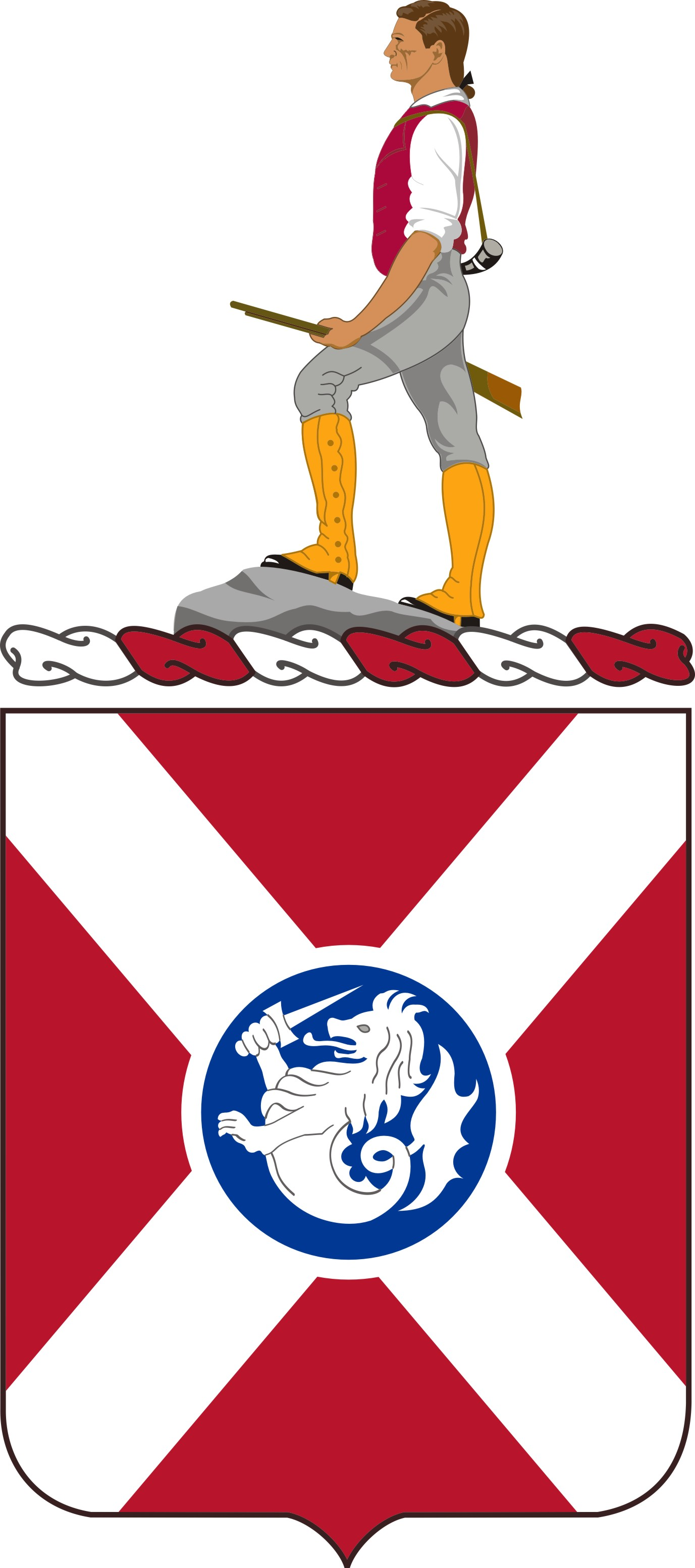
391st Engineer Battalion

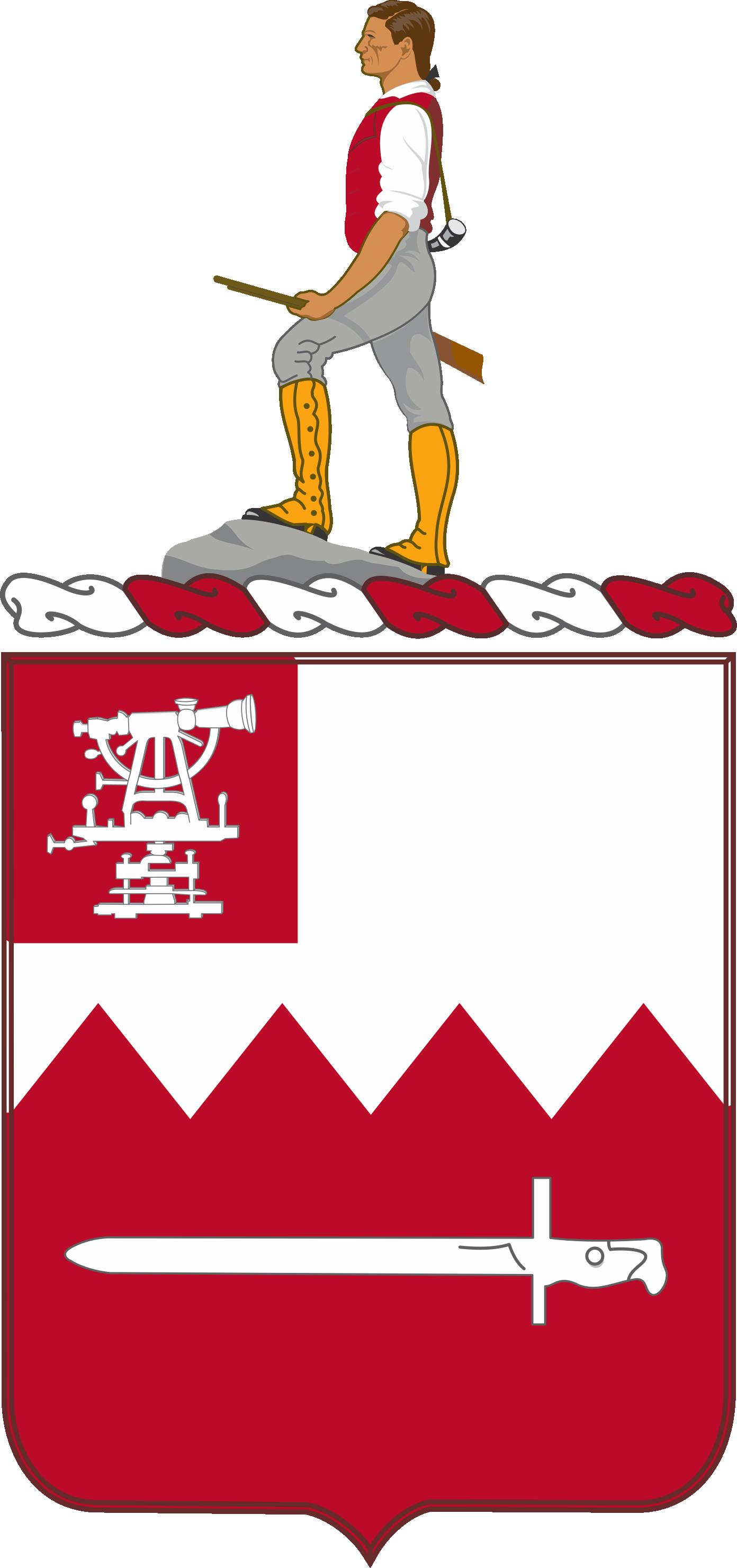
397th Engineer Battalion

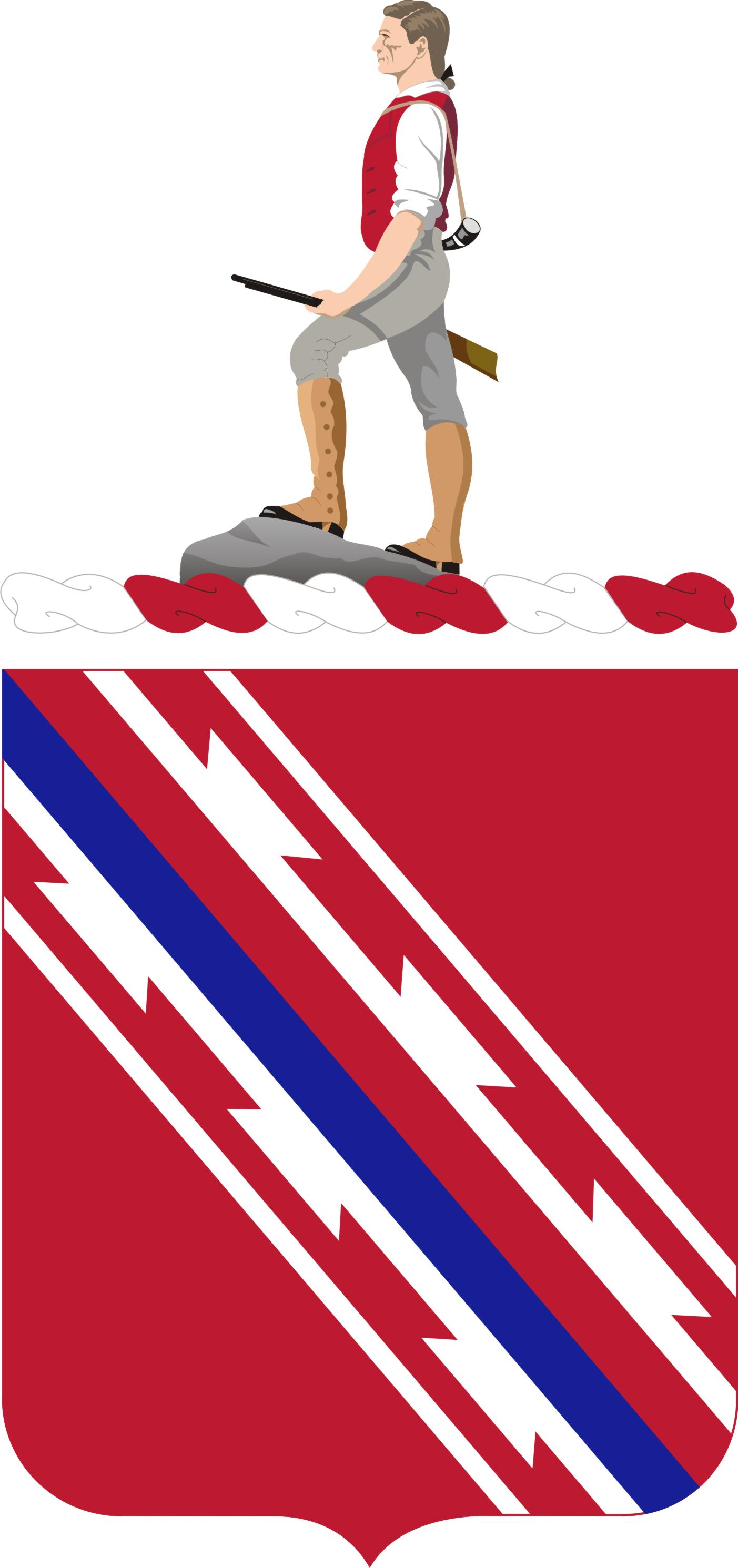
411th Engineer Battalion

458th Engineer Battalion

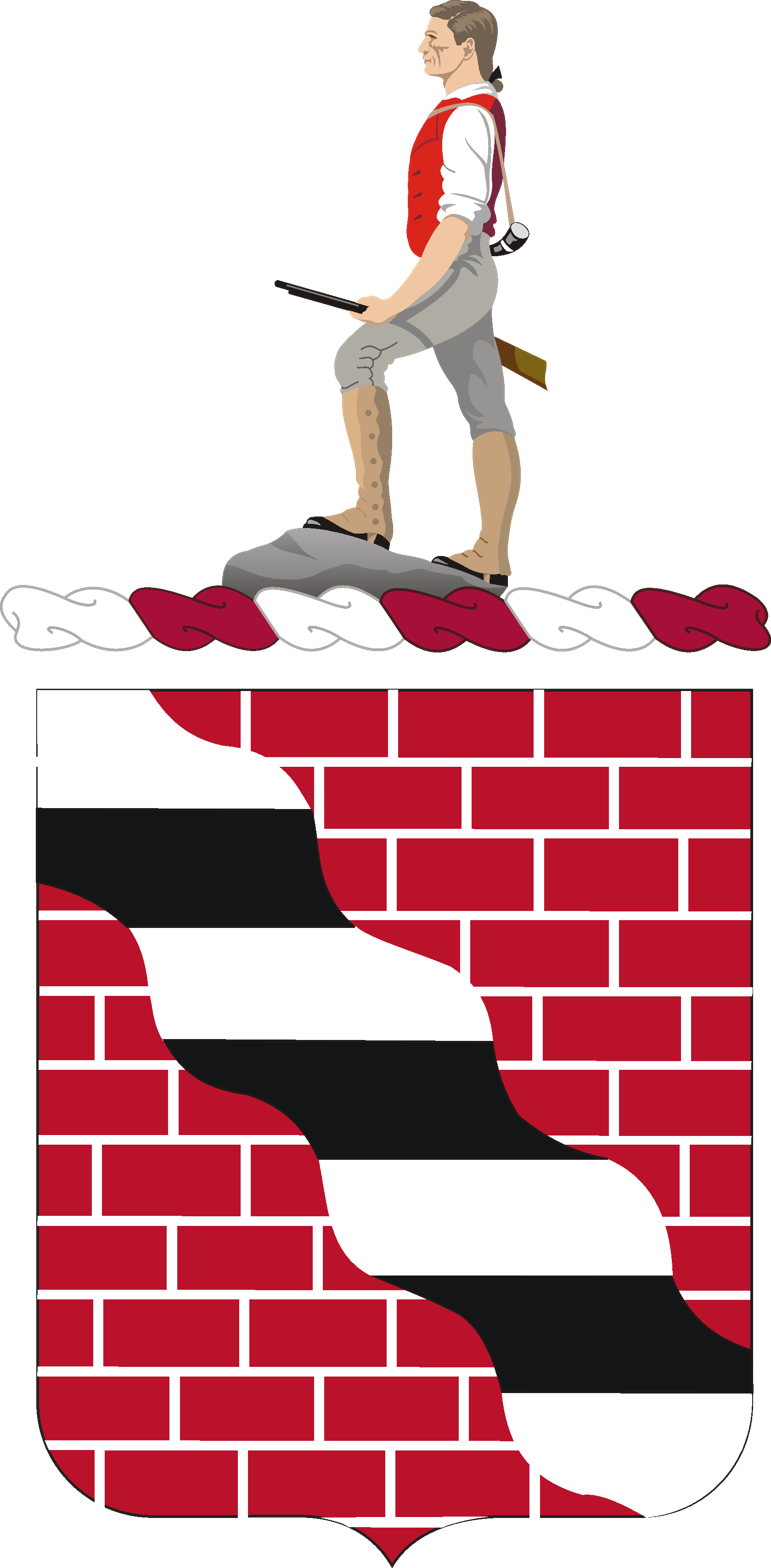
463rd Engineer Battalion

467th Engineer Battalion

479th Engineer Battalion

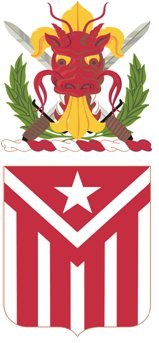
554th Engineer Battalion

== Finance units ==
=== 1 to 100 ===
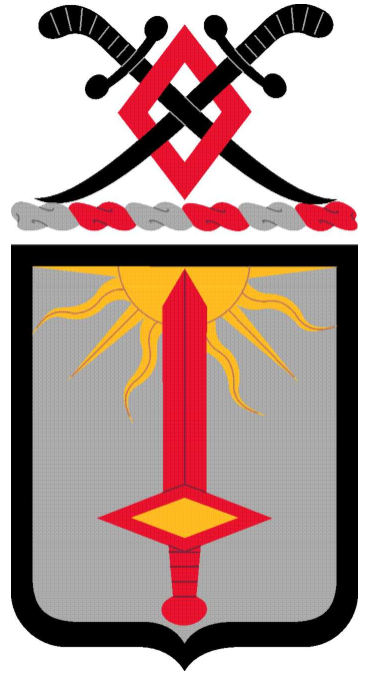
1st Finance Battalion
"First Diamonds"

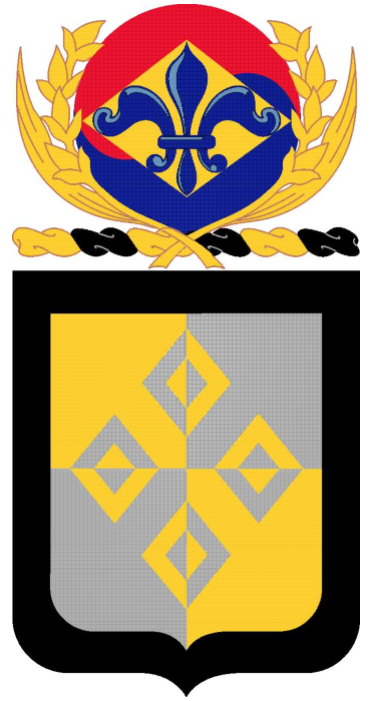
4th Finance Battalion
"Gloriamur Solvere" (Proud to Pay)
"Iron Eagles"

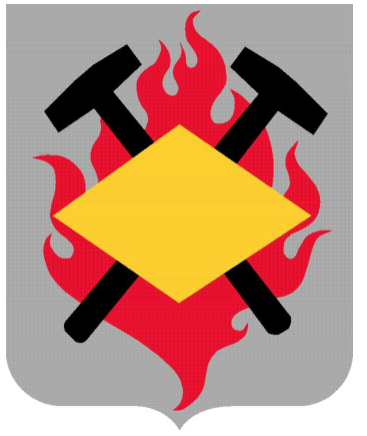
8th Finance Battalion
"Iron Finance"

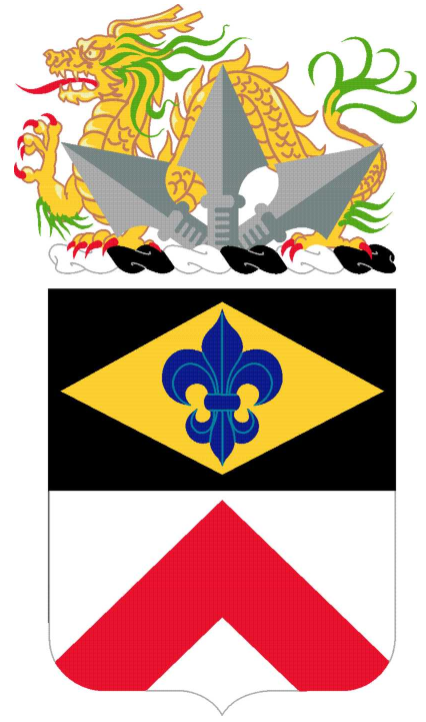
9th Finance Battalion
"Vanguard of Support"

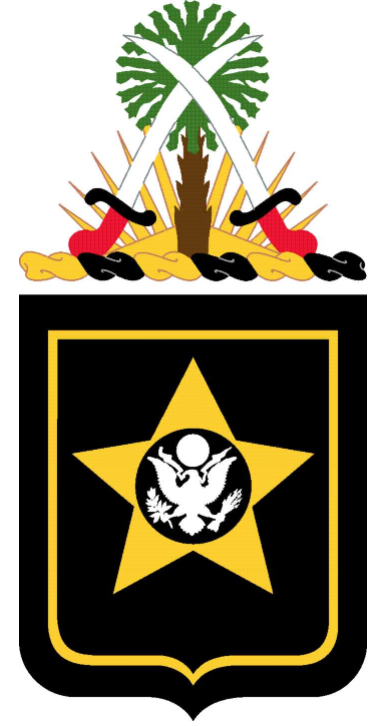
15th Finance Battalion
"Swift Support – First to Pay"

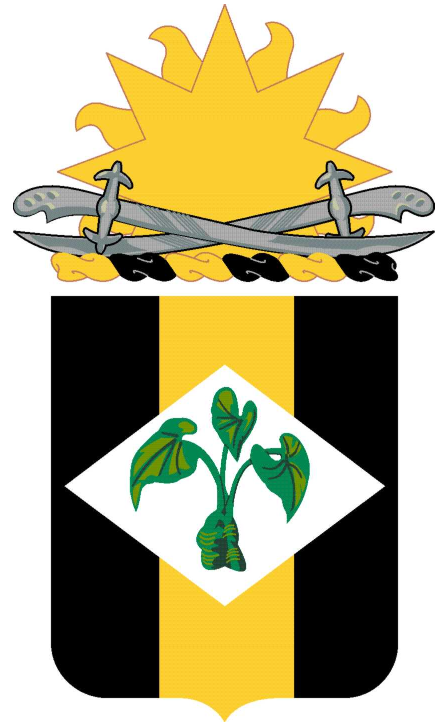
24th Finance Battalion
"Victory Paymasters"

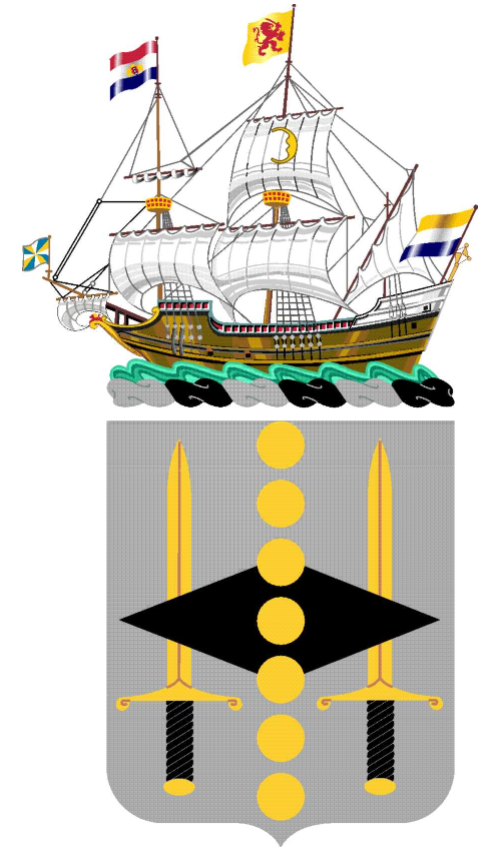
27th Finance Battalion
"Finance the Fight"

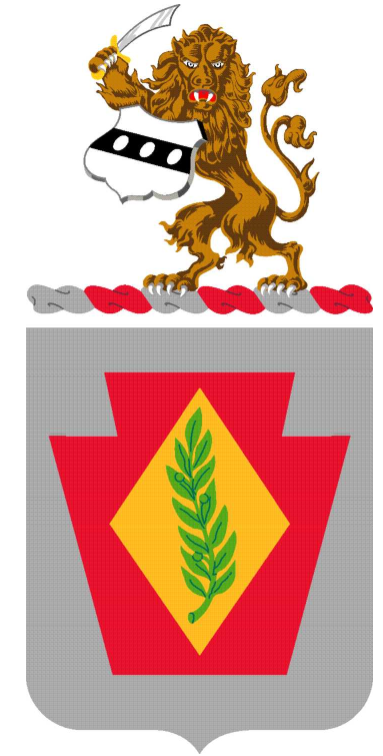
28th Finance Battalion
"Finance Excellence"

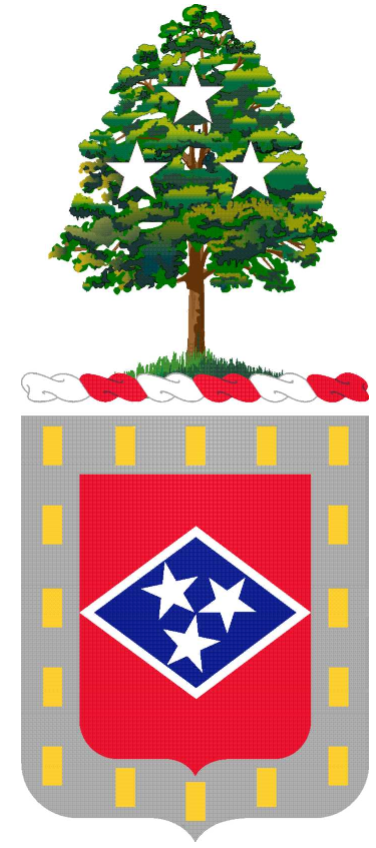
30th Finance Battalion
"First to Volunteer"

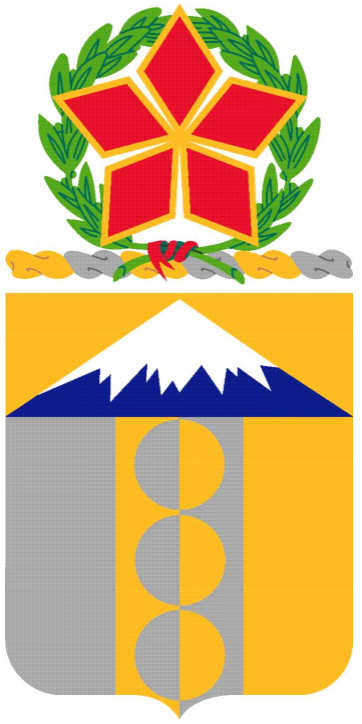
33rd Finance Battalion
"Mountain Paymasters"

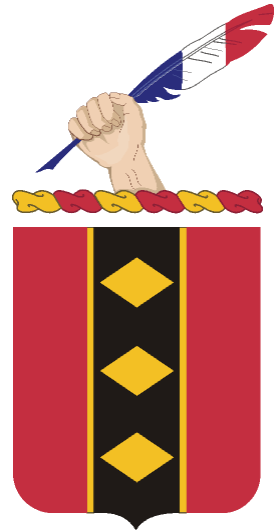
39th Finance Battalion
"Diamond Dedication"

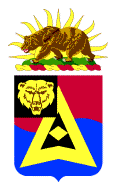
40th Finance Battalion
"Golden Bear – Swift Support"

49th Finance Battalion
"A Texas Tradition"

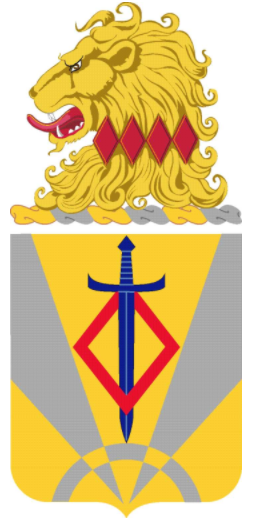
50th Finance Battalion
"Financial Excellence"

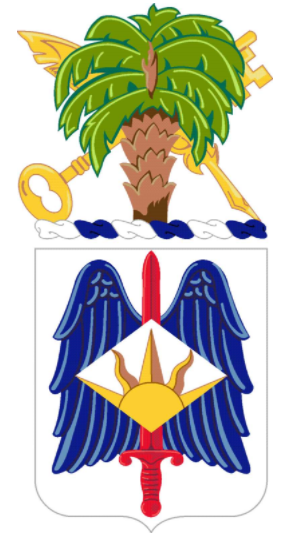
82nd Finance Battalion
"All American Paymasters"

=== 101 to 200 ===
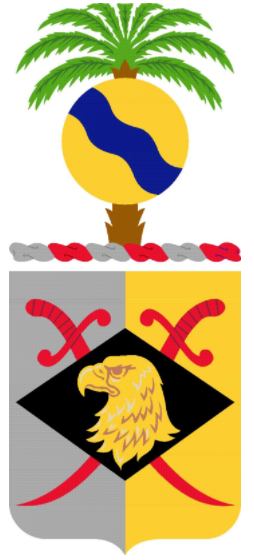
101st Finance Battalion
"Eagle's Treasure"

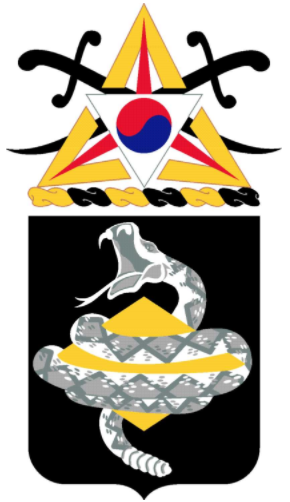
106th Finance Battalion
"The Diamondbacks"

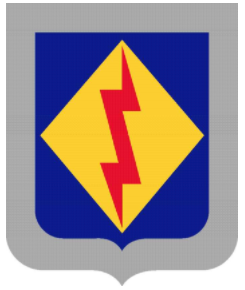
125th Finance Battalion
"Pacific Paymasters"

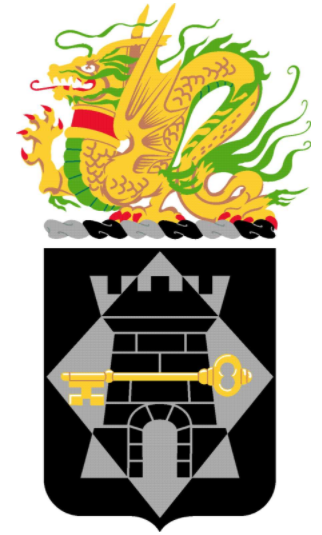
126th Finance Battalion
"Dragon Purser – Pay Ready"

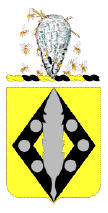
130th Finance Battalion
"Tarheel Paymasters"

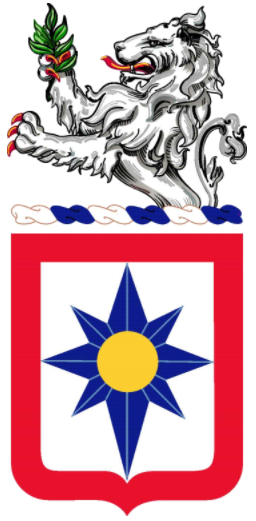
138th Finance Battalion
"Support Anywhere, Anytime"

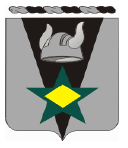
147th Finance Battalion
"Fit to Fight, Ready to Pay"

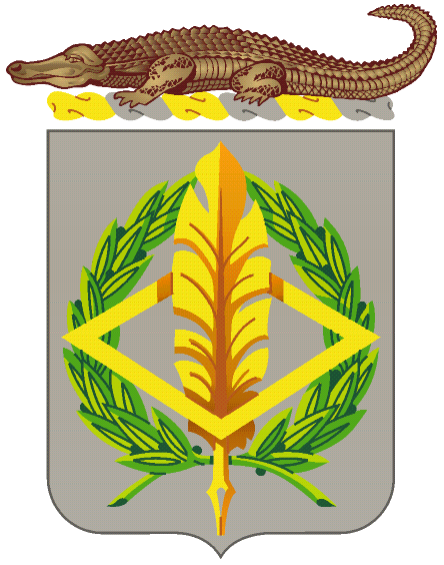
153rd Finance Battalion
"We Pay the Best"

158th Finance Battalion
"Sirviendo Soldados" (Serving Soldiers)

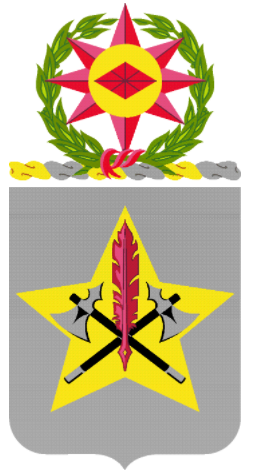
177th Finance Battalion
"Diamond in the Rock"

=== 201 on ===
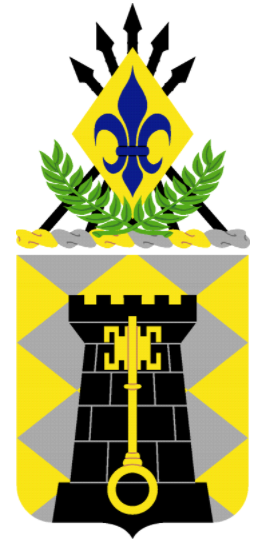
208th Finance Battalion
"Service Pay Support"

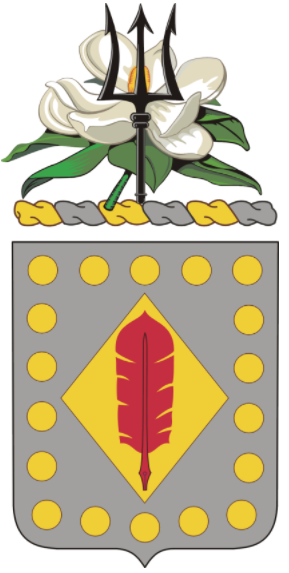
210th Finance Battalion
"Duty, Honor"

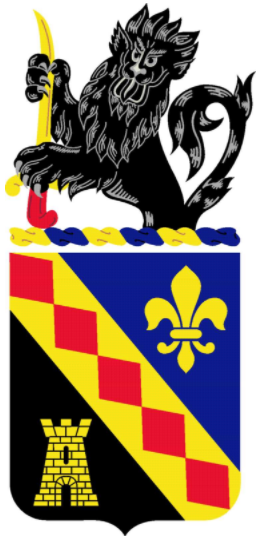
215th Finance Battalion
"A Tradition of Excellence"

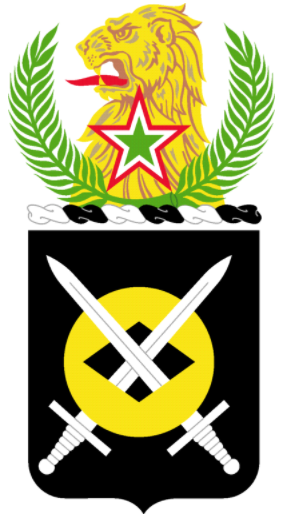
230th Finance Battalion
"Always There and Ready"

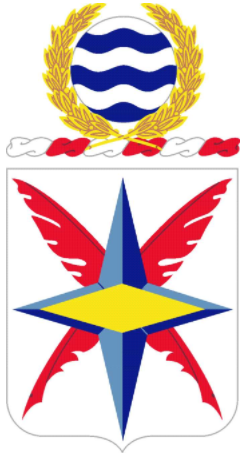
267th Finance Battalion
"Arctic Paymasters"

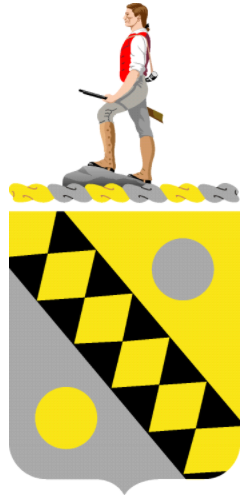
325th Finance Battalion
"Paying the Best"

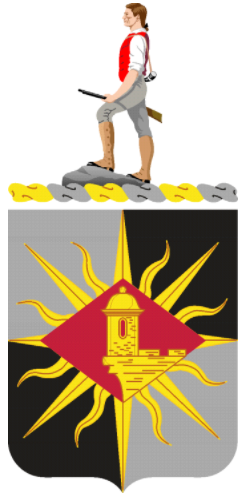
338th Finance Battalion
"In Finance We Trust"

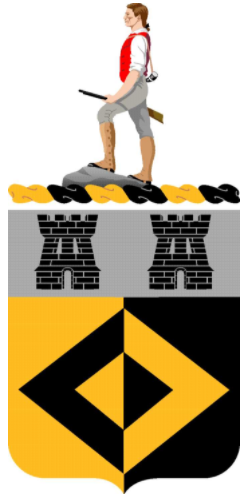
368th Finance Battalion
"Tested, Tried, Qualified"

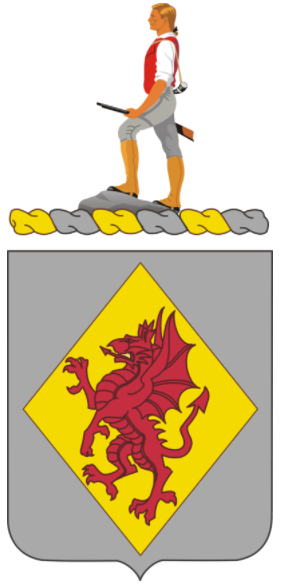
374th Finance Battalion
"Financing the Fight"

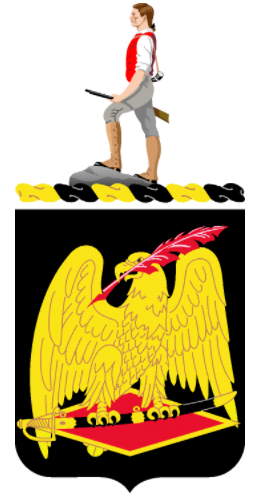
376th Finance Battalion
"To Serve"

395th Finance Battalion
"Pay with Pride"

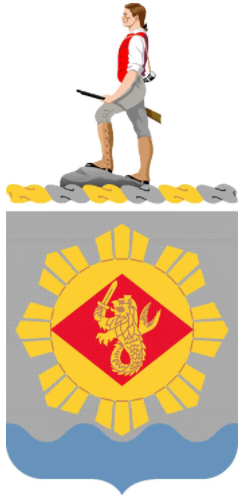
453rd Finance Battalion
"We Serve Soldier Interests"

726th Finance Battalion
"Pay Ensured, Fit to Fight"

== Infantry units ==
The coats of arms for infantry units normally incorporate the color blue, which has been the traditional color of the infantry in the U.S. Army since 1851. Active duty units that have served in war are authorized a crest. National Guard units are authorized the crest for their respective state, while Army Reserve units are all authorized a crest depicting a minuteman.

=== 1 to 100 ===
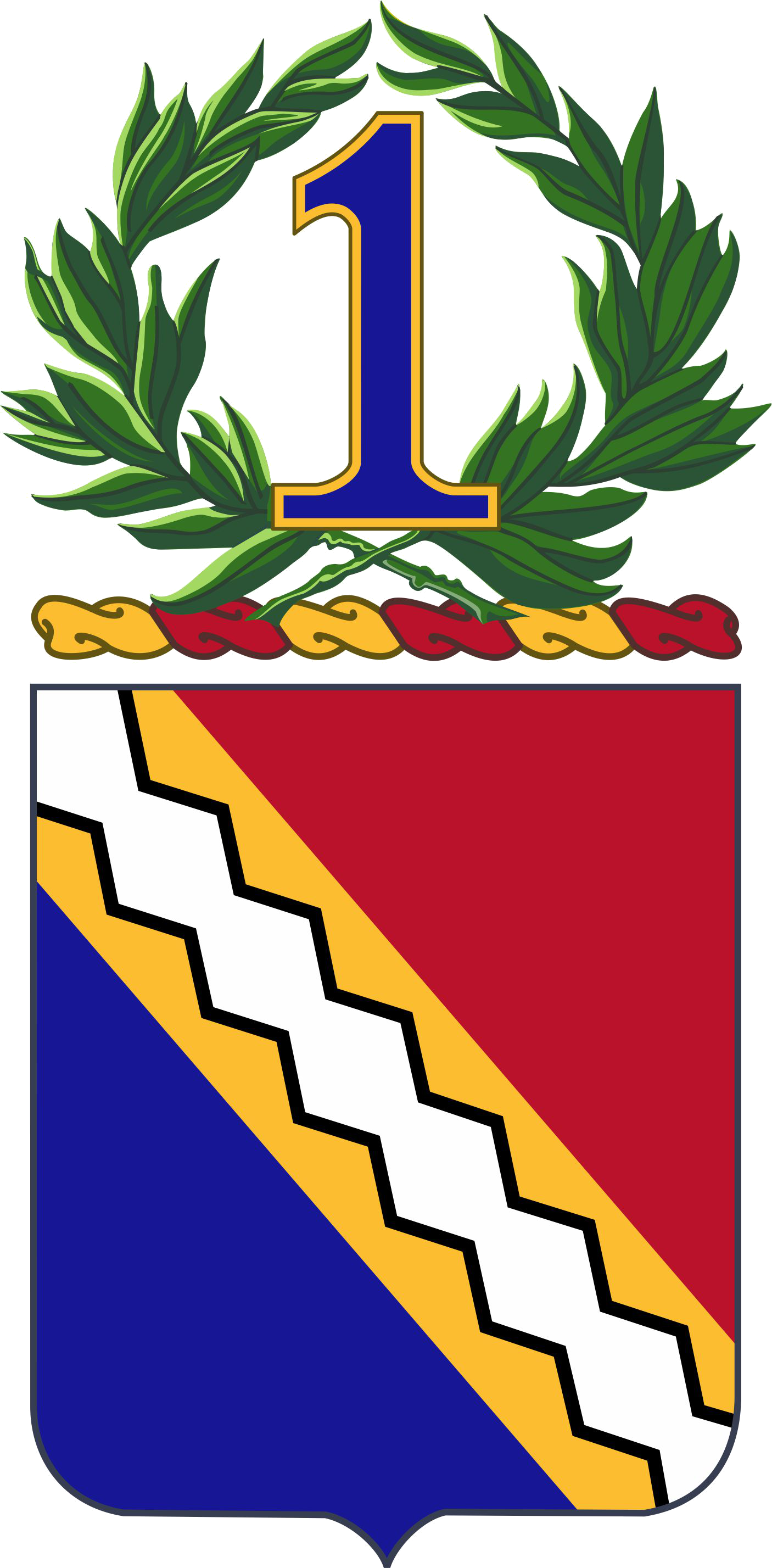
1st Infantry
"Semper Primus"
(Always First)

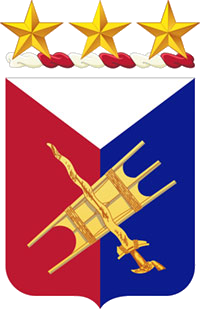
1st Filipino Infantry
"Laging una"
(Always First)

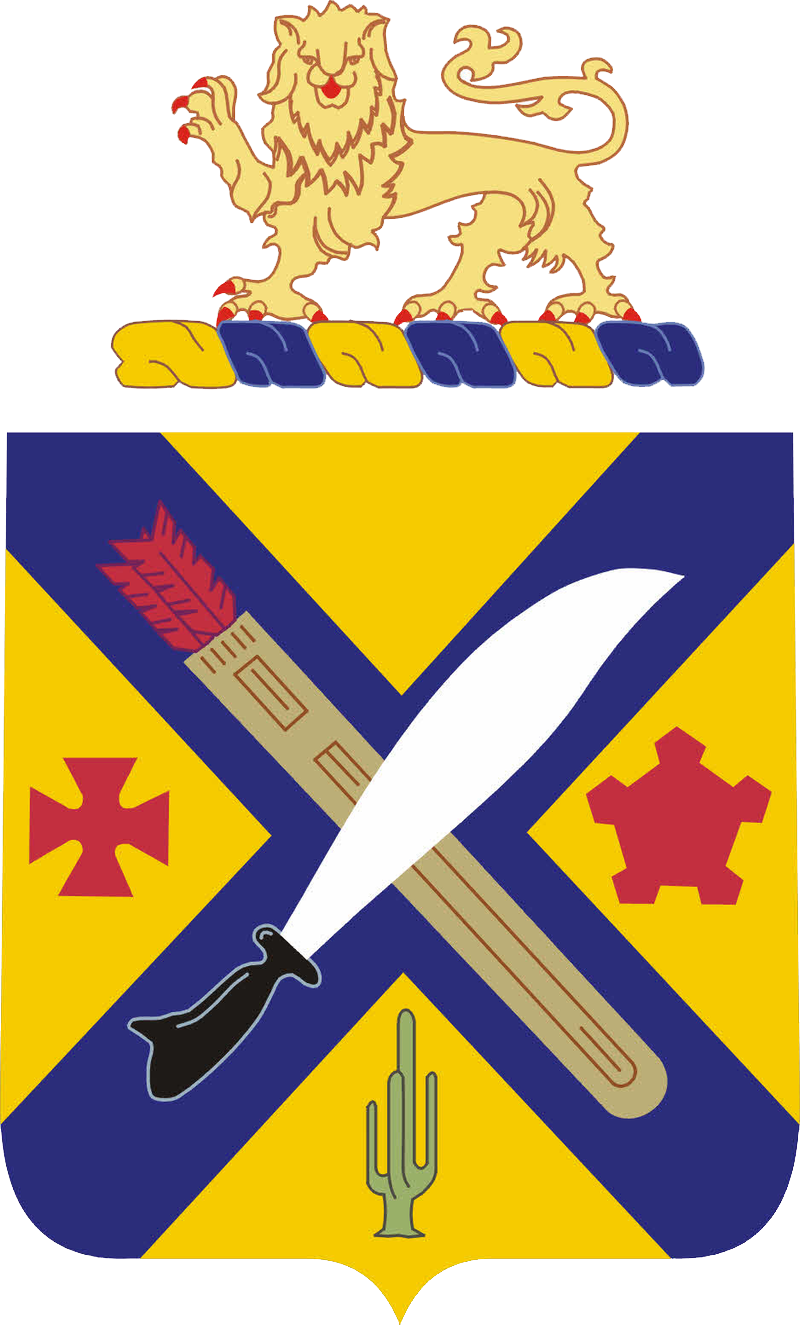
2nd Infantry
"Noli Me Tangere"
(Touch Me Not)
"Ramrods"

3rd Infantry
"Noli Me Tangere" (Touch Me Not)
"The Old Guard"

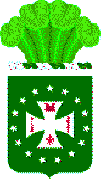
4th Infantry
"Noli Me Tangere"
(Touch Me Not)
"Warriors"

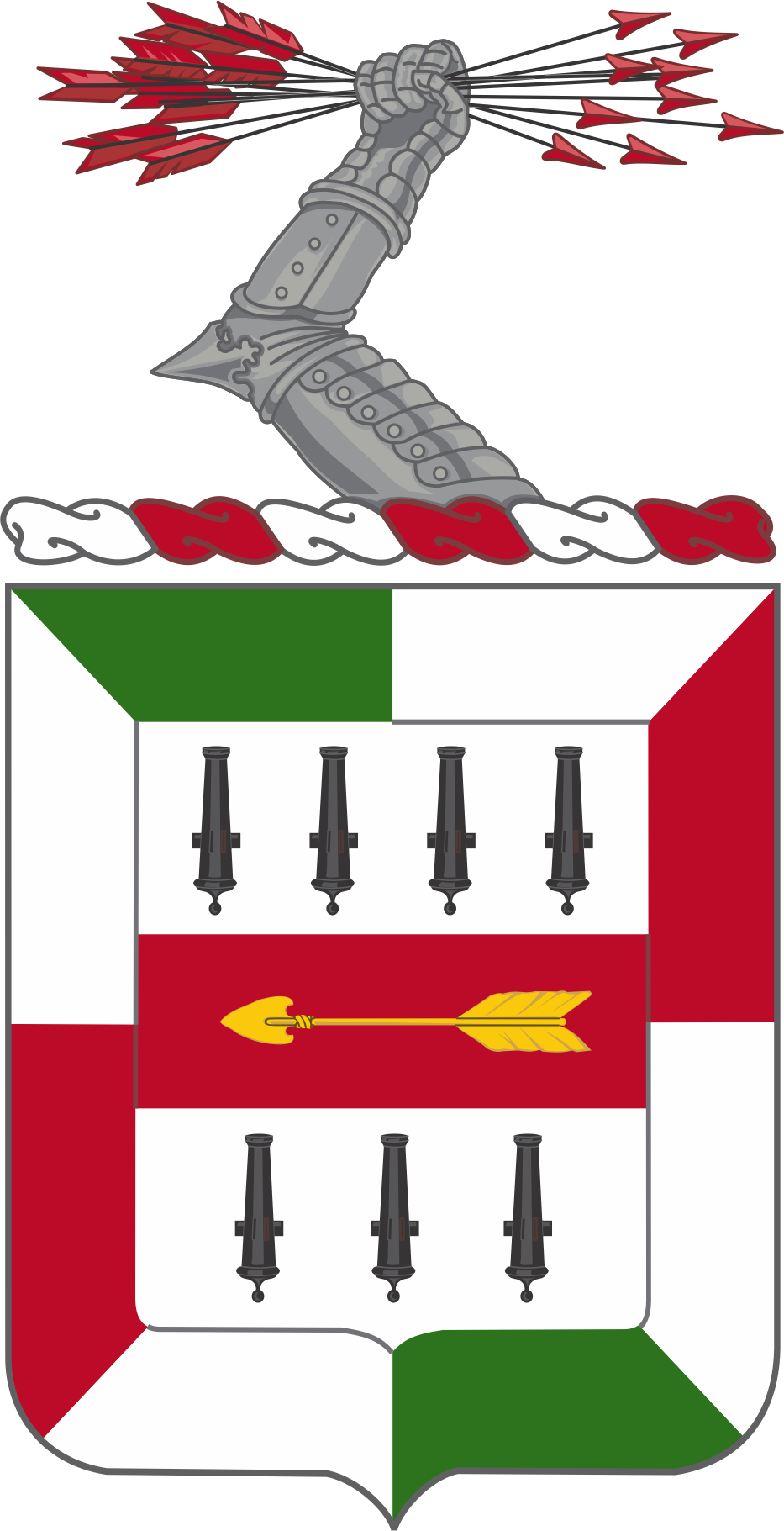
5th Infantry
"I'll Try, Sir"
"Bobcats"

6th Infantry
"Unity is Strength"
"Regulars"

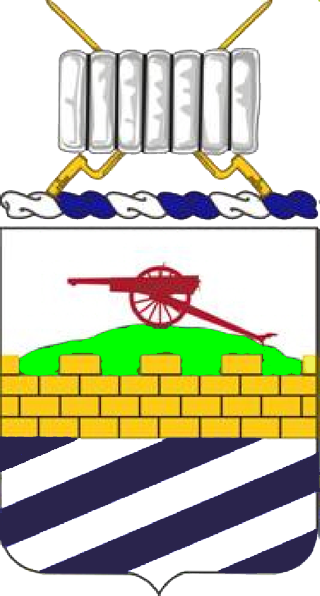
7th Infantry
"Volens et Potens" (Willing and Able)
"Cottonbalers"

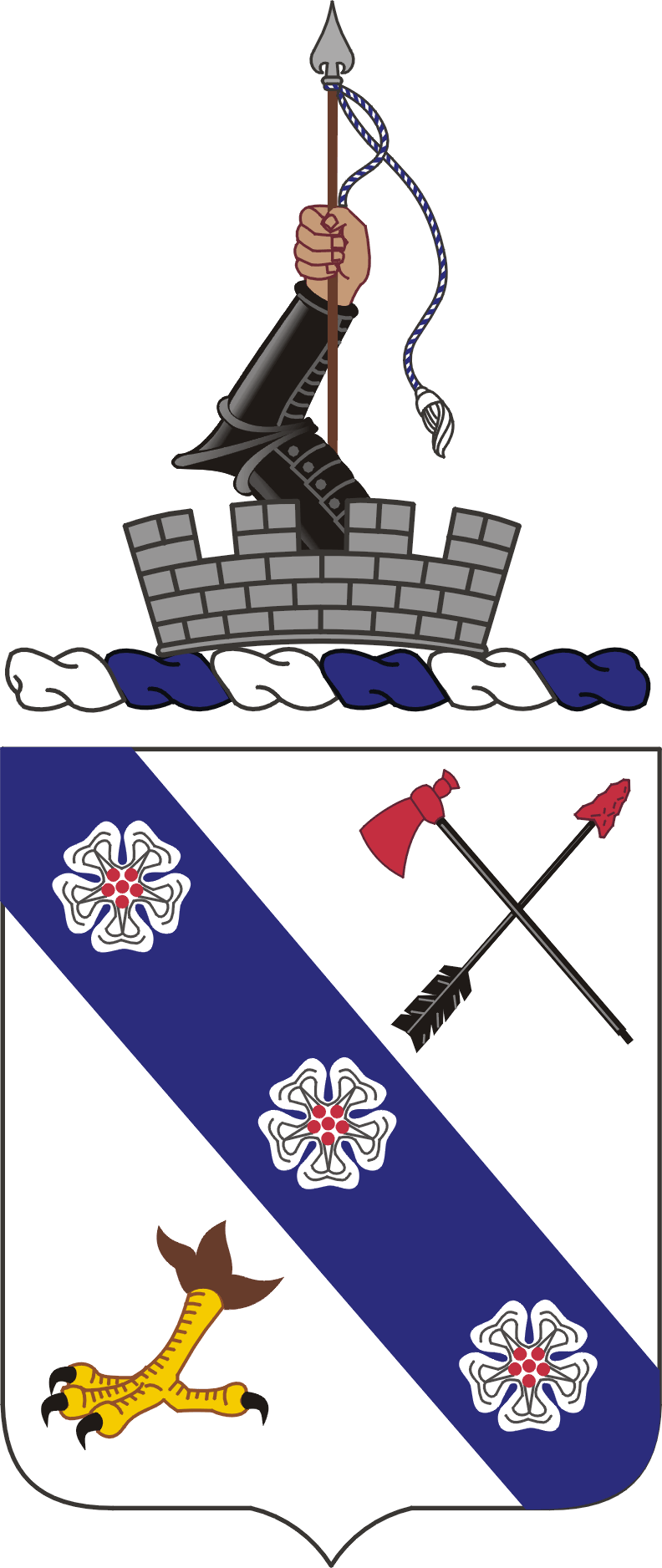
8th Infantry
"Patriae Fidelitas"
(Loyalty to Country)
"Fighting Eagles"

9th Infantry
"Keep Up the Fire!"
"Manchu"

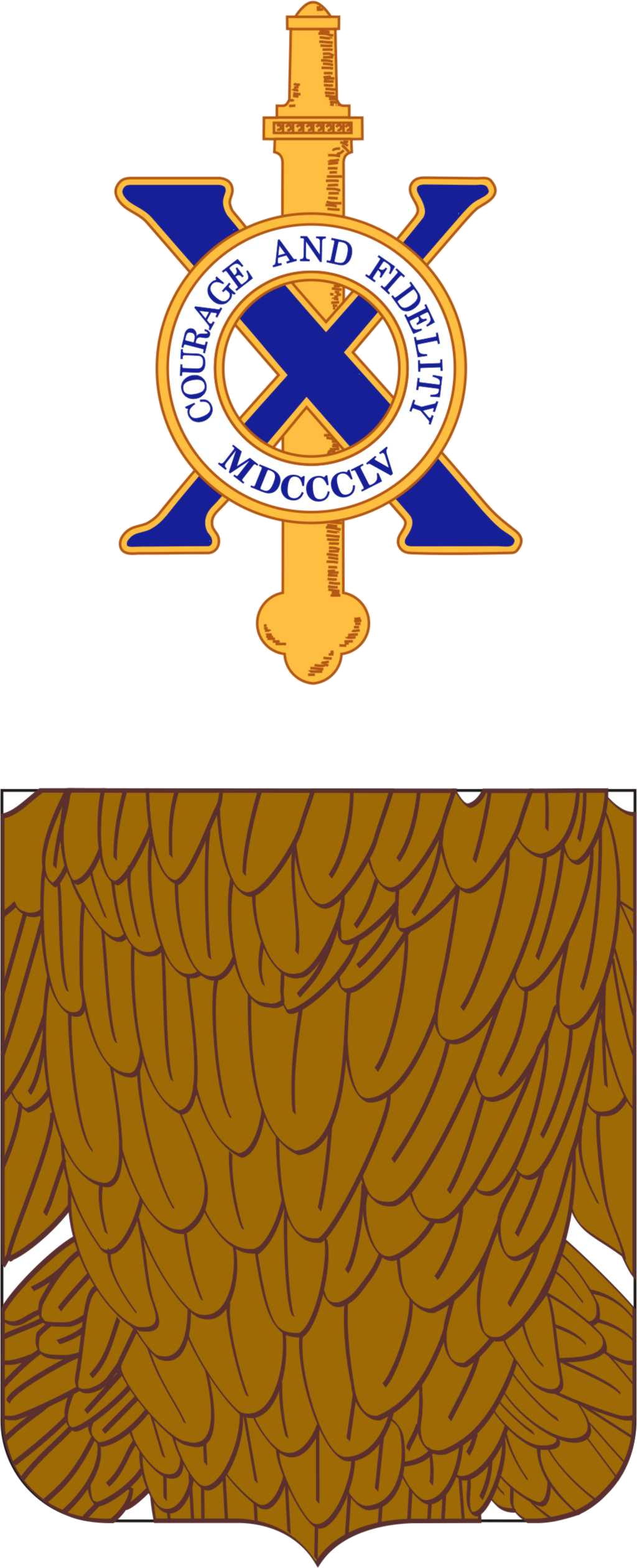
10th Infantry
(No COA. DUI above eagle on colors)
"Courage and Fidelity"

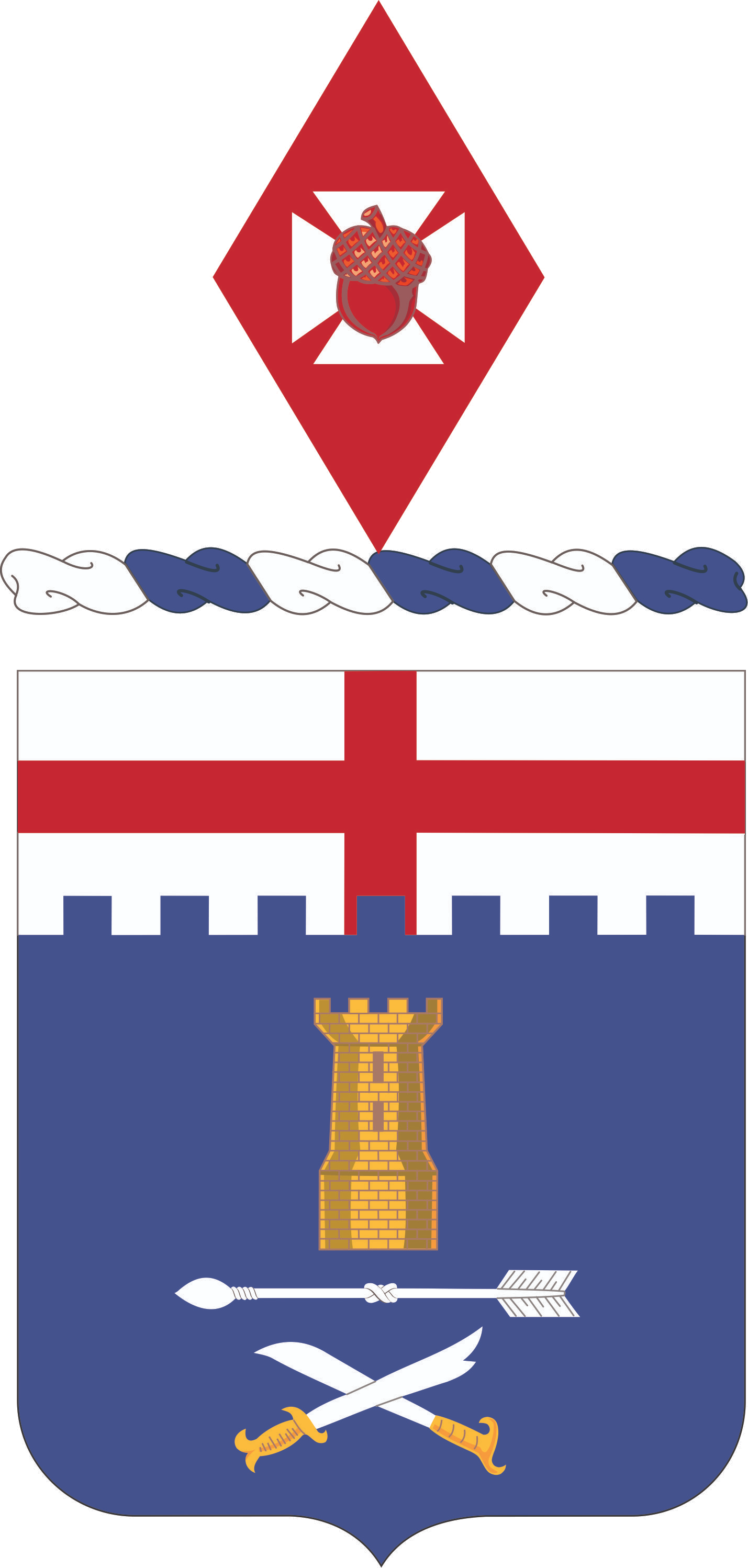
11th Infantry
"Semper Fidelis"
(Always Faithful)

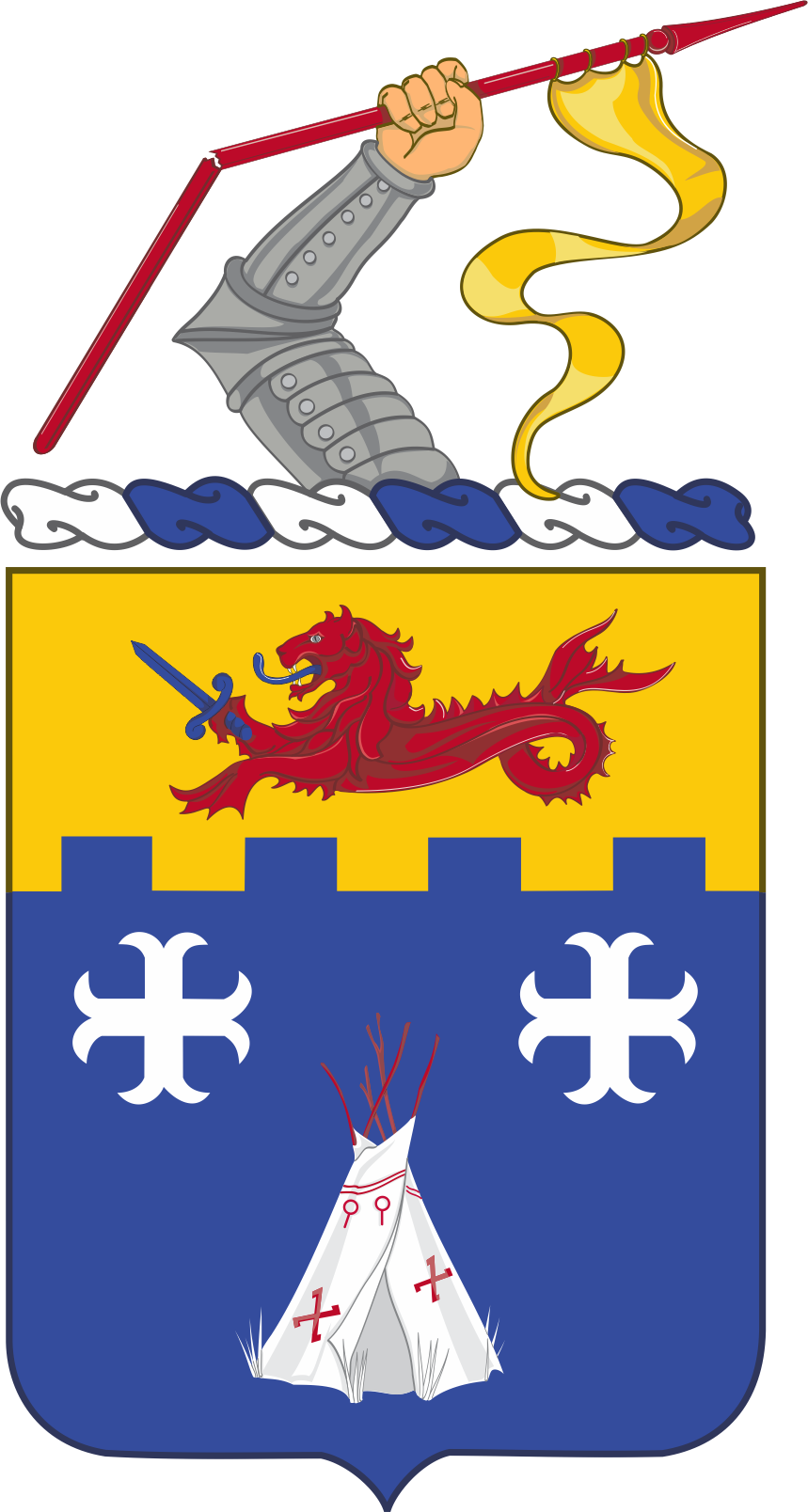
12th Infantry
"Ducti Amore Patriae"
(Having Been Led by Love of Country)

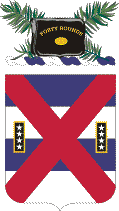
13th Infantry
"First at Vicksburg"

14th Infantry
"The Right of the Line"
"Golden Dragons"

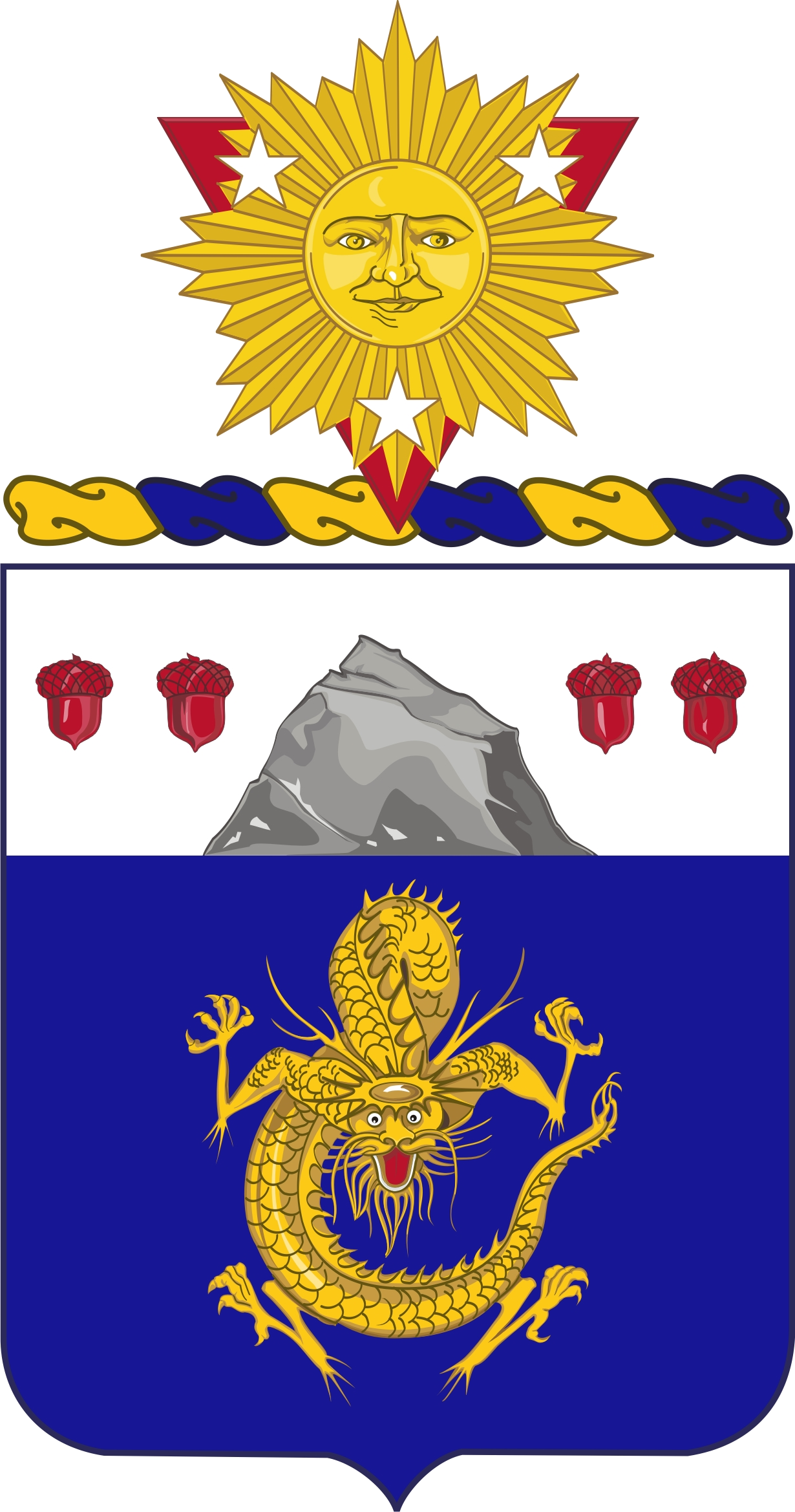
15th Infantry
"Can Do"

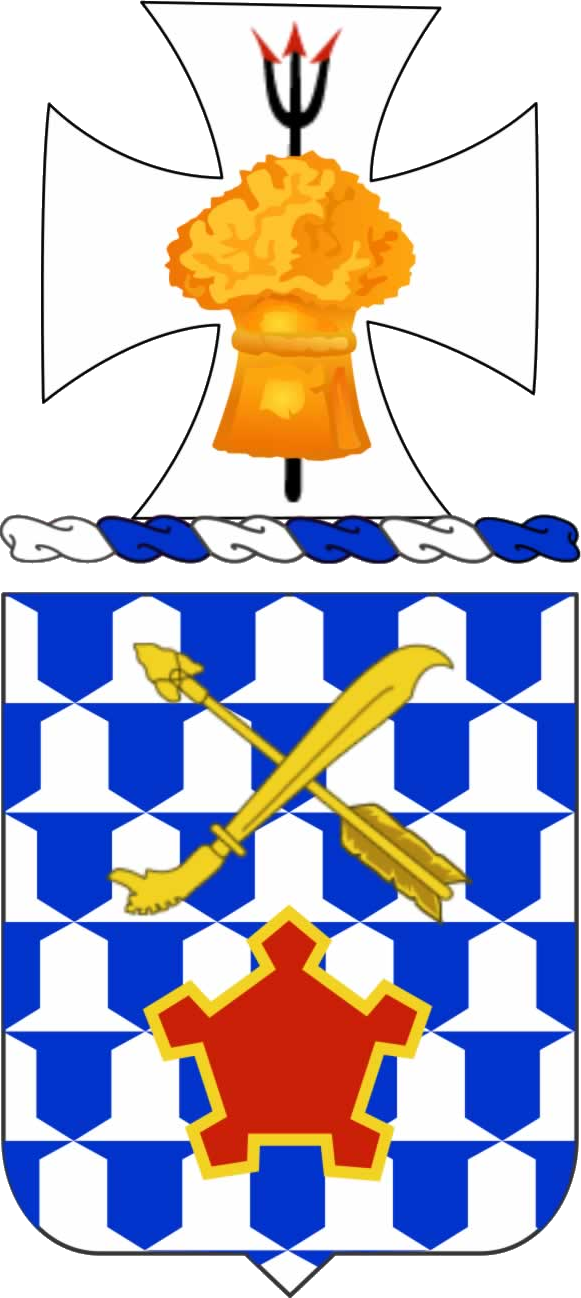
16th Infantry
"Semper Paratus" (Always Prepared)

17th Infantry
"Truth and Courage"

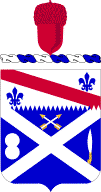
18th Infantry
"In Omnia Paratus" (Prepared for All Things)
"Vanguards"

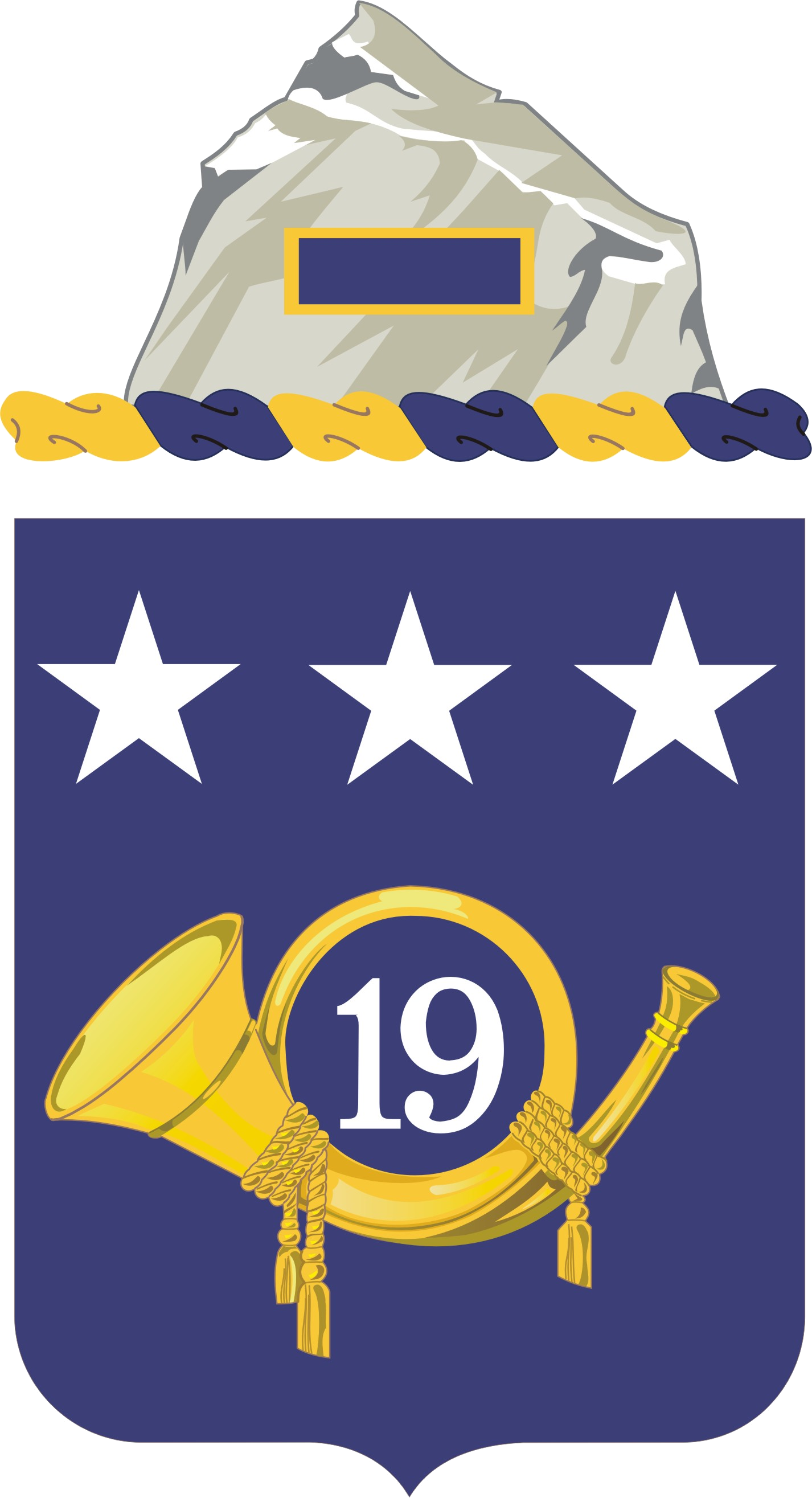
19th Infantry
"Rock of Chickamauga"

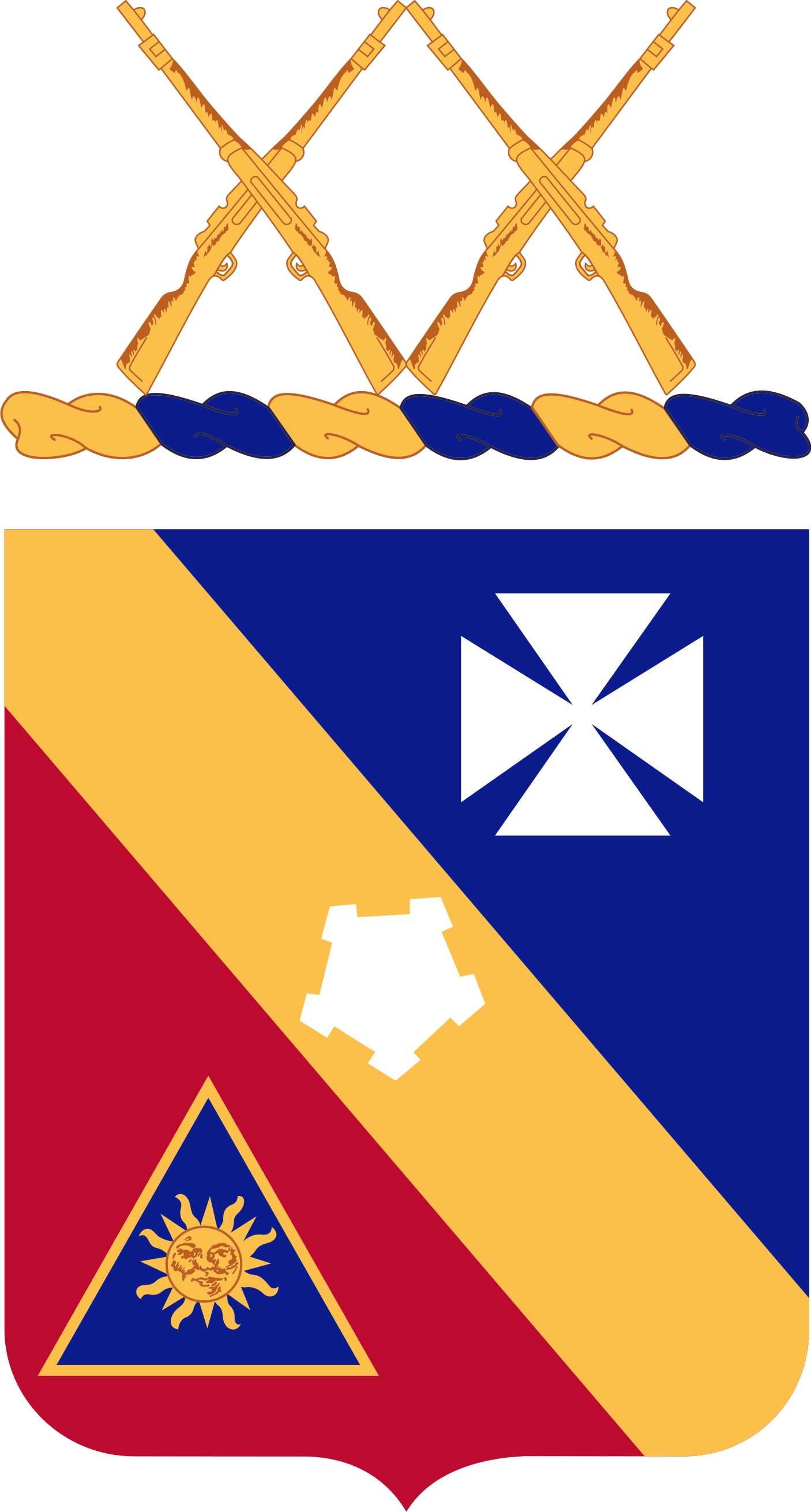
20th Infantry
"Tant Que Je Puis" (To the Limit of Our Ability)
"Sykes' Regulars"

21st Infantry
"Duty"
"Gimlet"

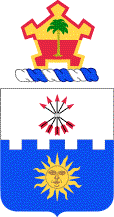
22nd Infantry
"Deeds not Words"

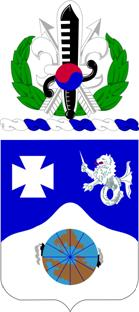
23rd Infantry
"We Serve"
"Tomahawk Regiment"

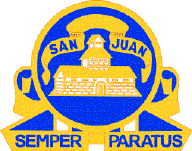
24th Infantry
(no COA; badge shown)
"Semper Paratus" (Always Prepared)
"Deuce Four"

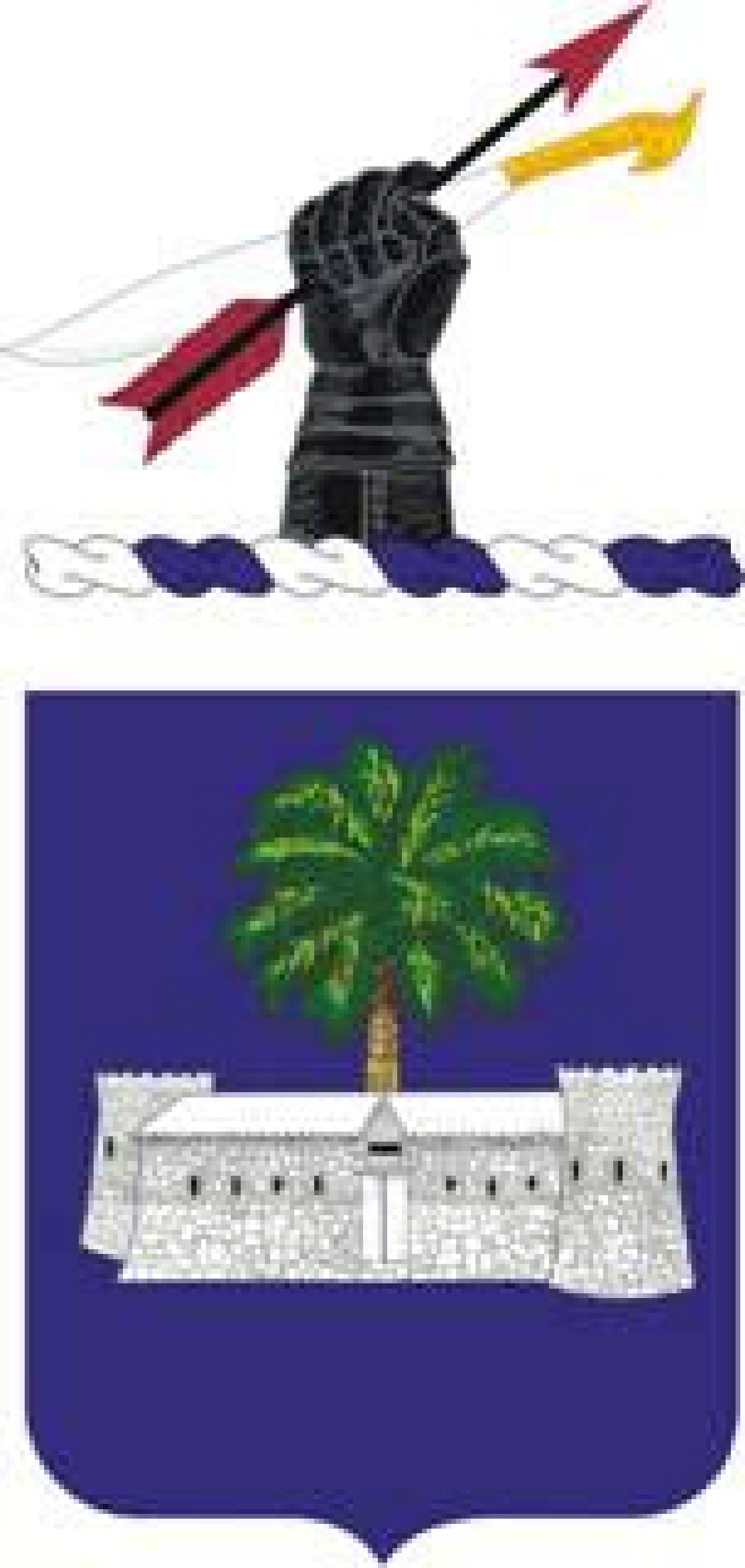
25th Infantry
"Onward"
(now 25th Armored Infantry Battalion)

26th Infantry
"Palmam Qui Meruit Ferat" (Let Him Bear The Palm Who Has Won It)
"Blue Spades"

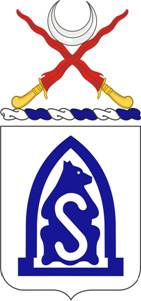
27th Infantry
"Nec Aspera Terrent" (Frightened By No Difficulties)
"Wolfhounds"

28th Infantry
"Vincit Amor Patriae" (Love of Country Conquers)
"Lions of Cantigny"

29th Infantry
"We Lead the Way"
"Pioneers"

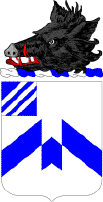
30th Infantry
"Our Country Not Ourselves"

31st Infantry
"Pro Patria" (For the Country)
"Polar Bears"

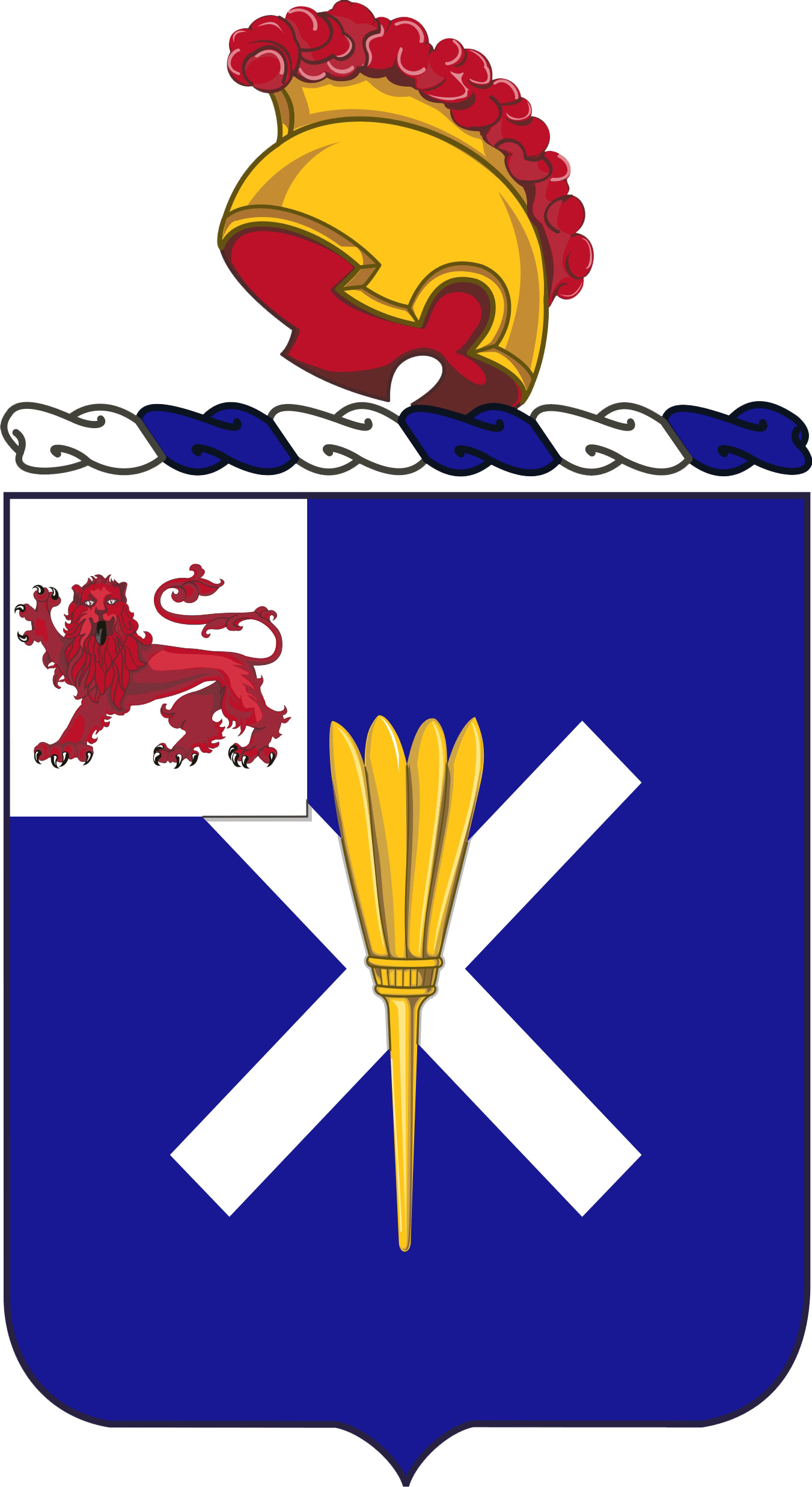
32nd Infantry
"Against All Odds"
"Queen's Own"

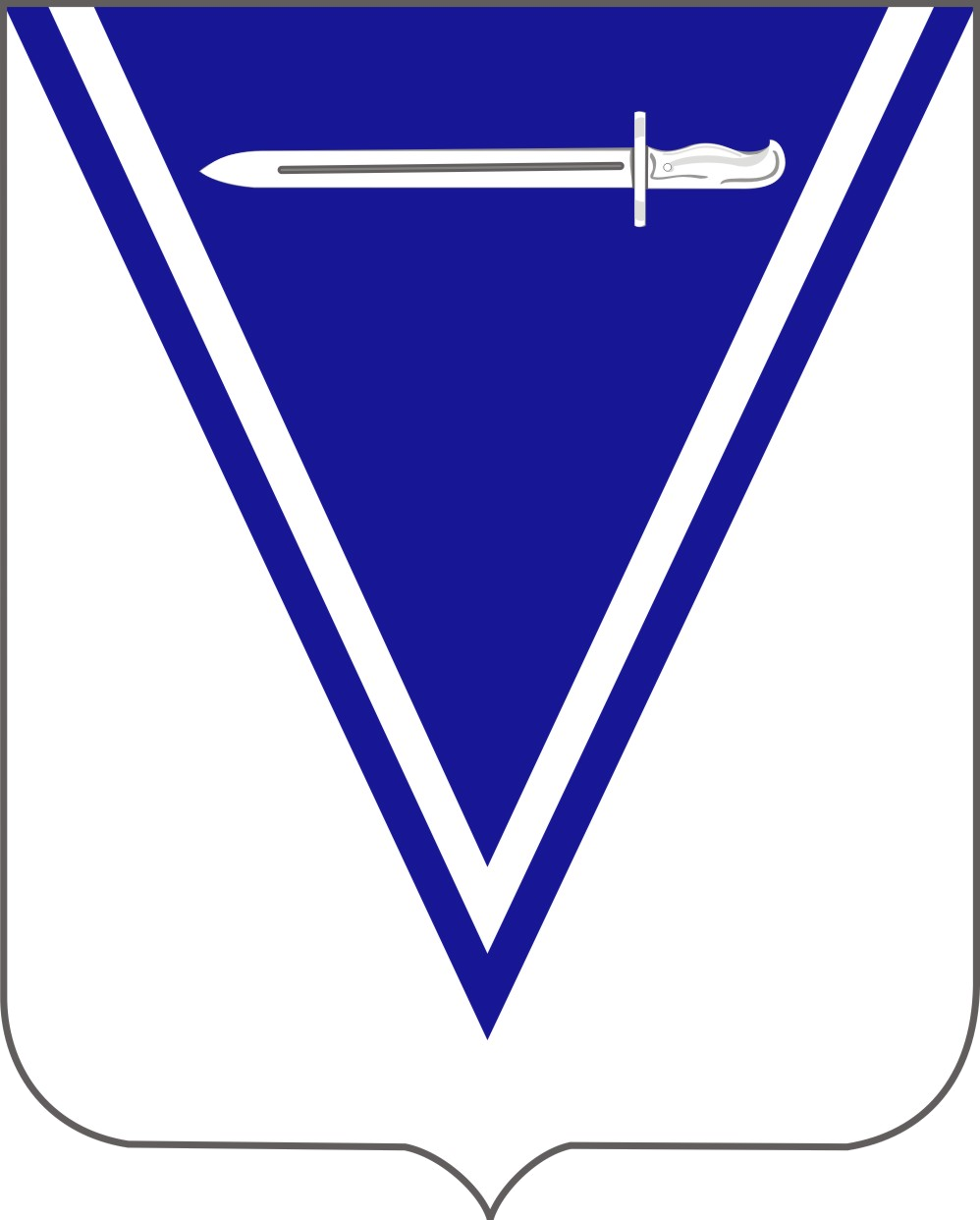
33rd Infantry
"Ridentes Venimus" (Smiling We Come)

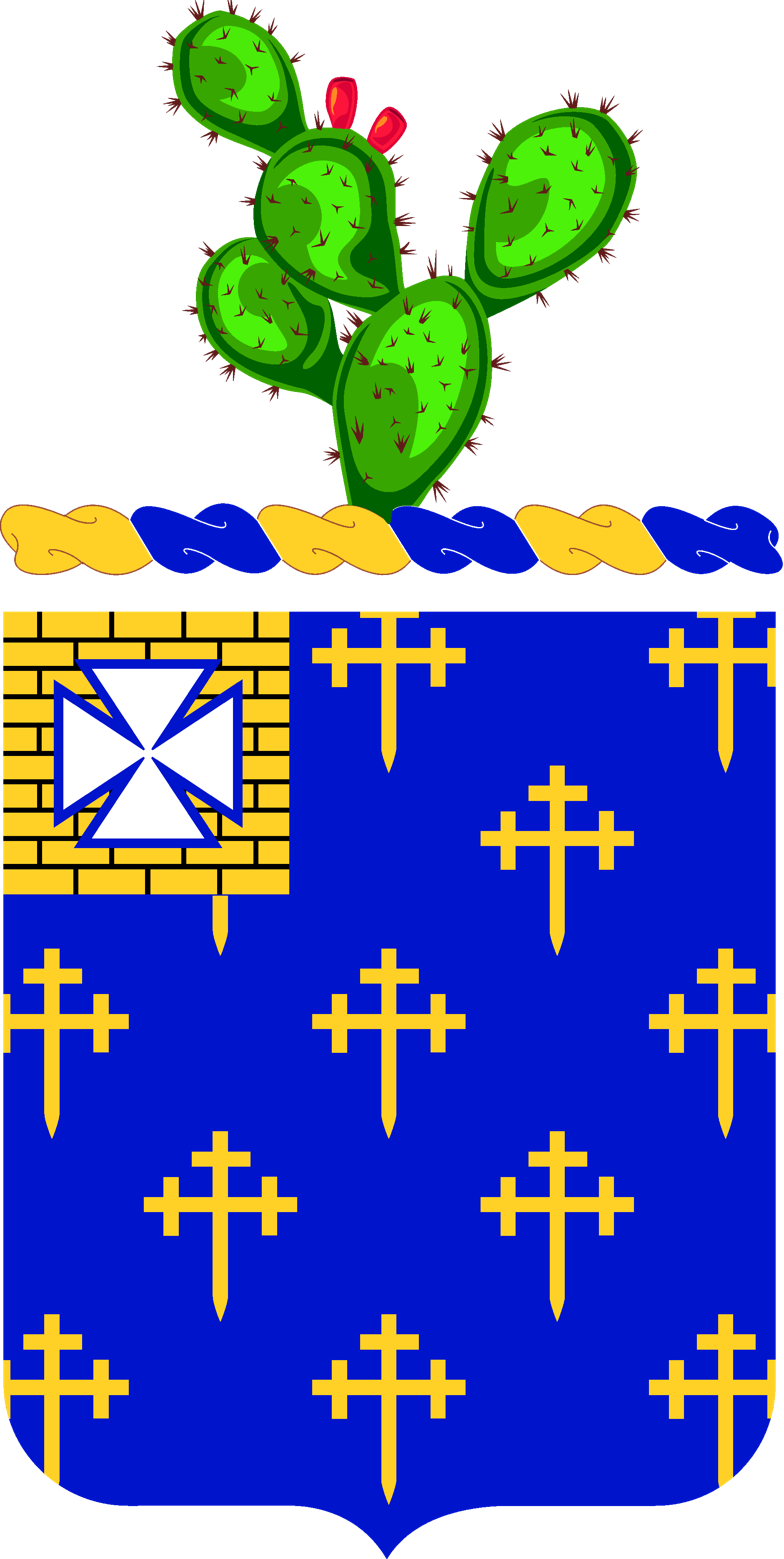
34th Infantry
"Toujours En Avant" (Always Forward)
"Leyte Dragons"

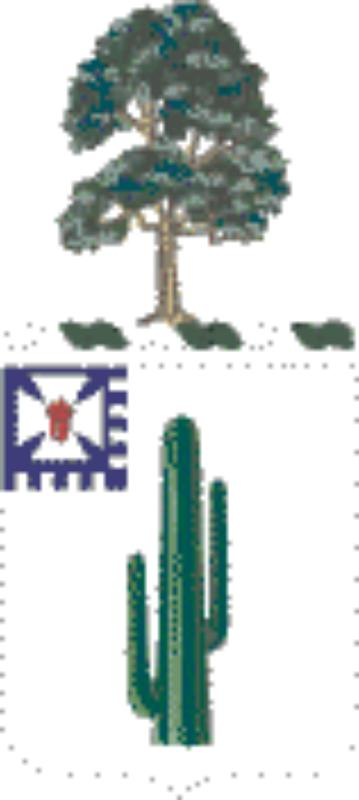
35th Infantry
"Take Arms!"
"Cati"

36th Infantry
"Deeds Not Words"

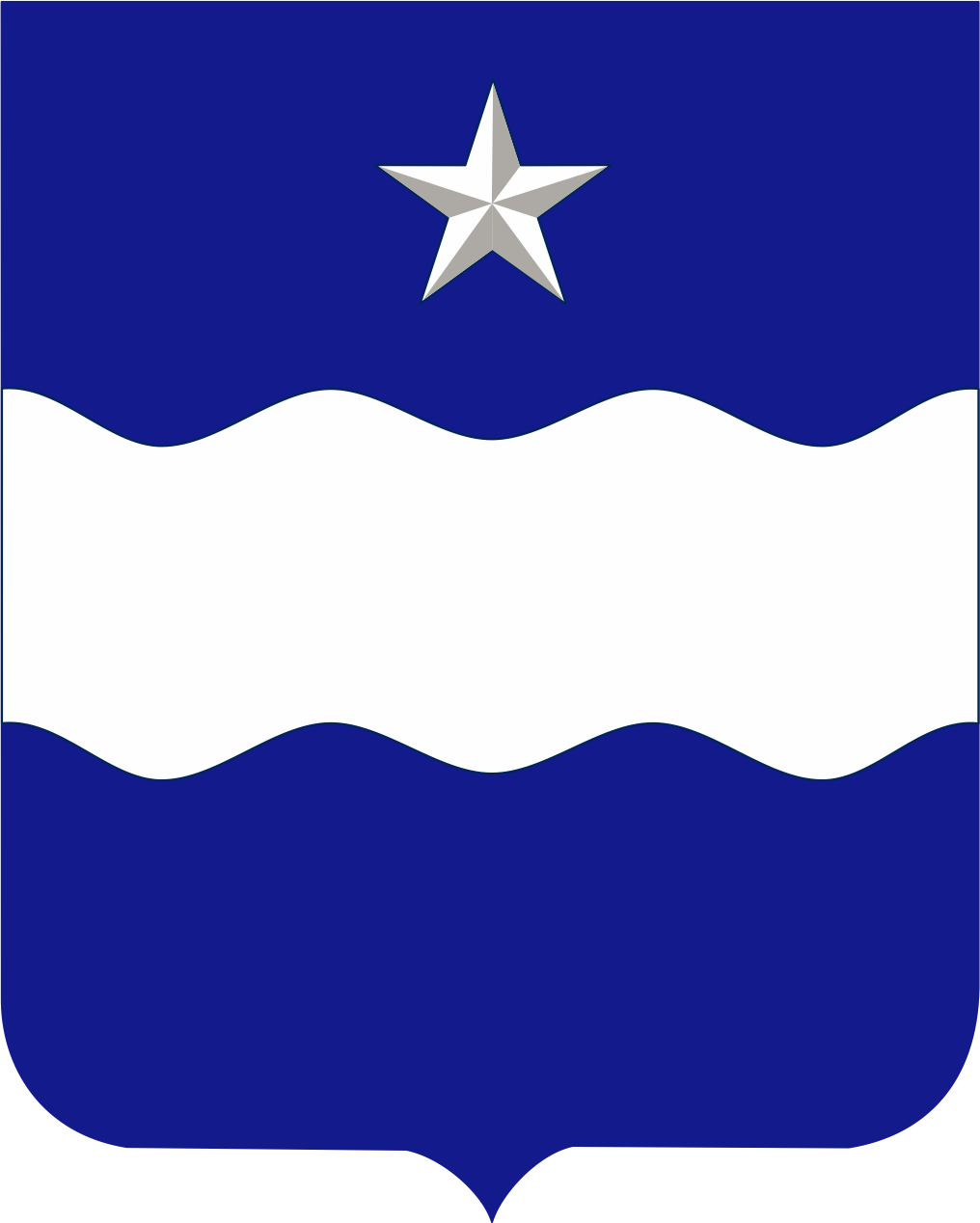
37th Infantry
"For Freedom"

38th Infantry
"Rock of the Marne"

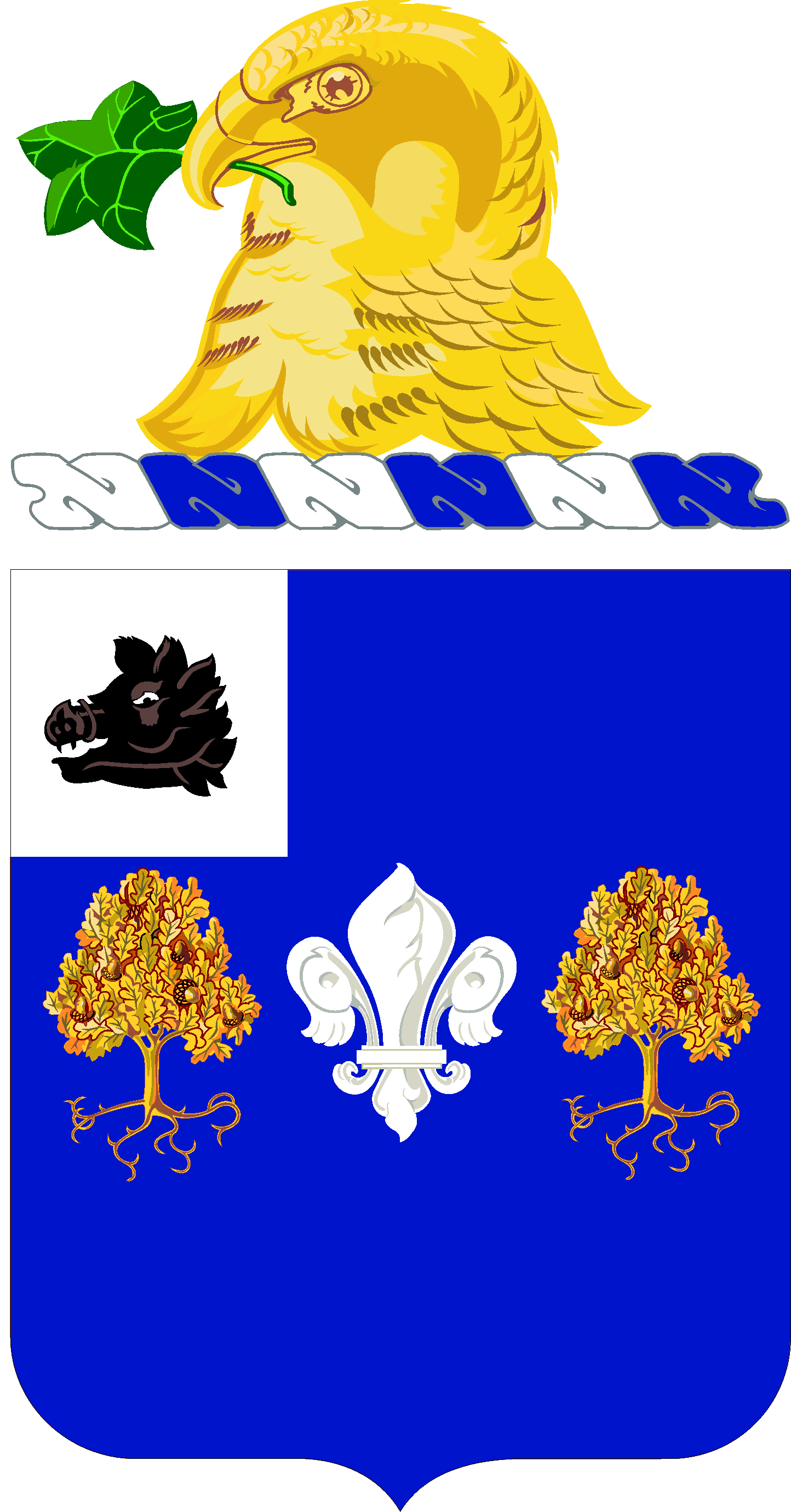
39th Infantry
D'Une Vaillance Admirable (With a courage worthy of admiration)
"AAA-O (Anything, Anytime, Anywhere, Bar Nothing)"

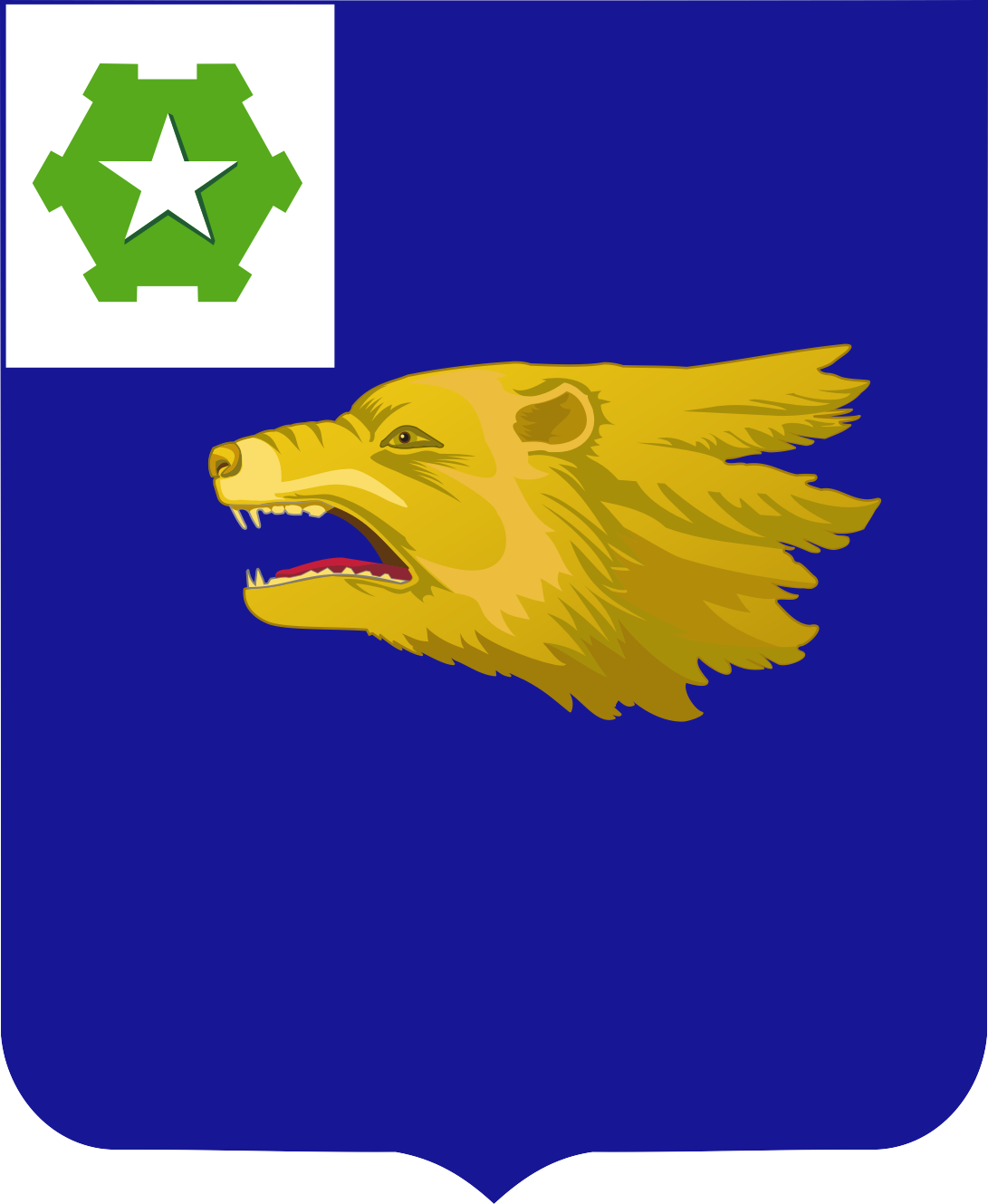
40th Infantry

41st Infantry
"Straight and Stalwart"

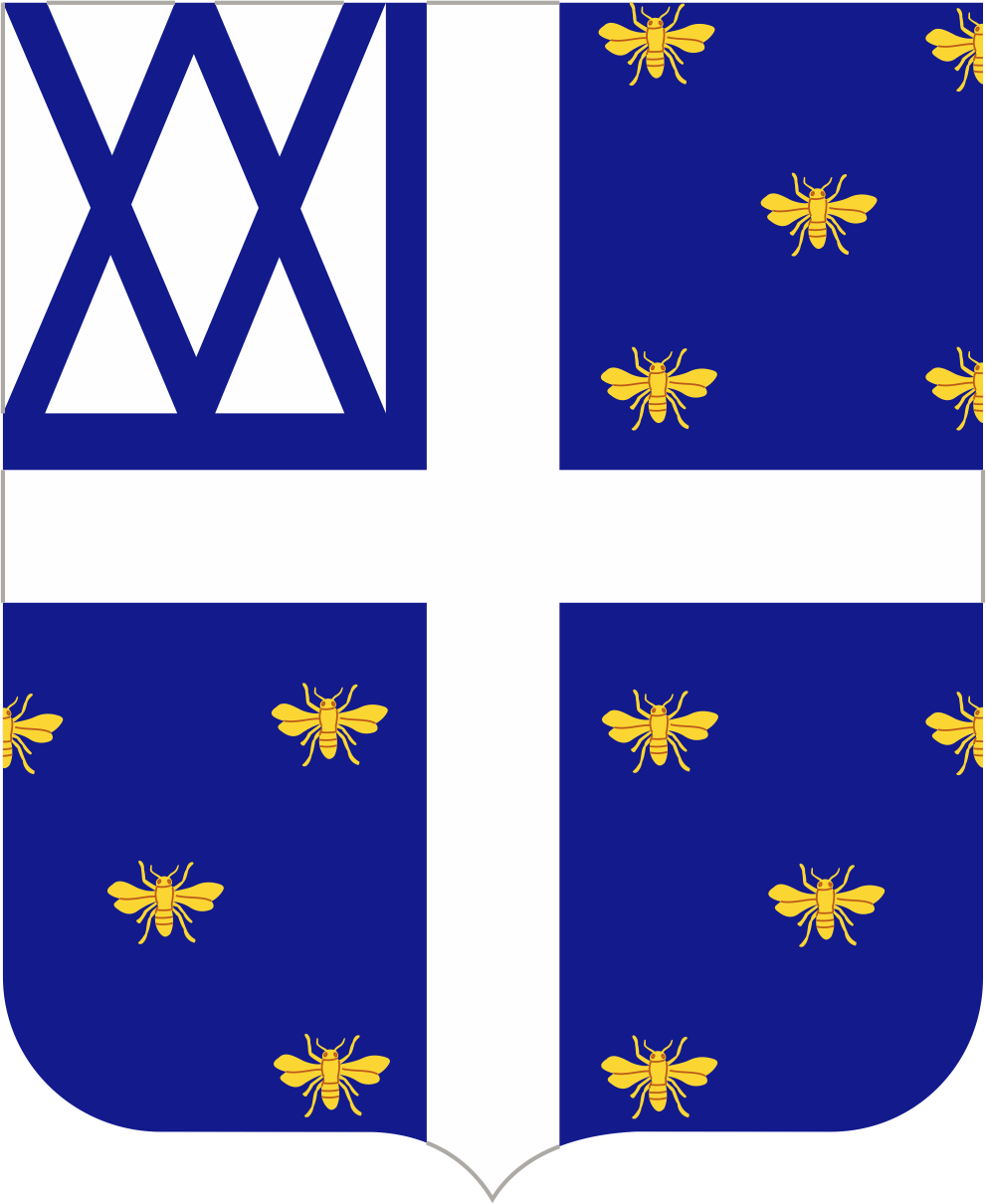
42nd Infantry

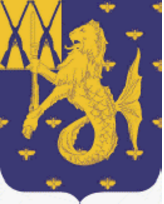
43rd Infantry

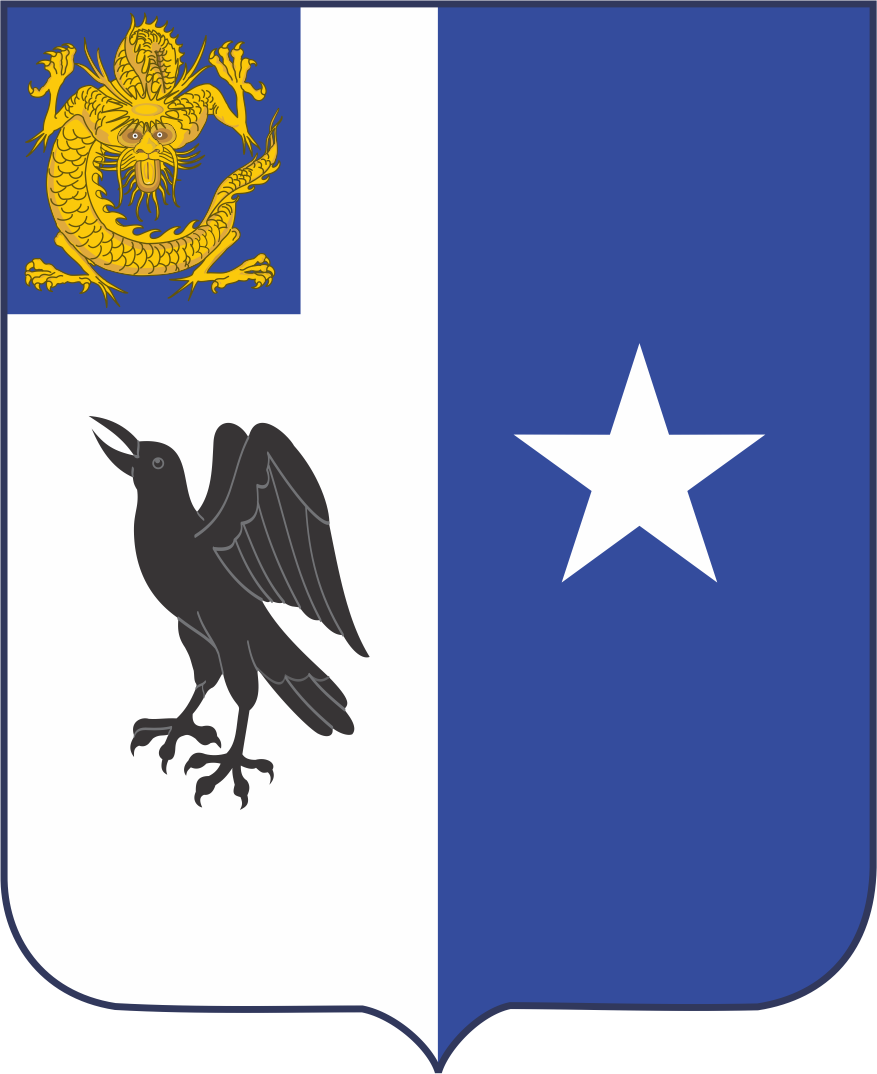
44th Infantry

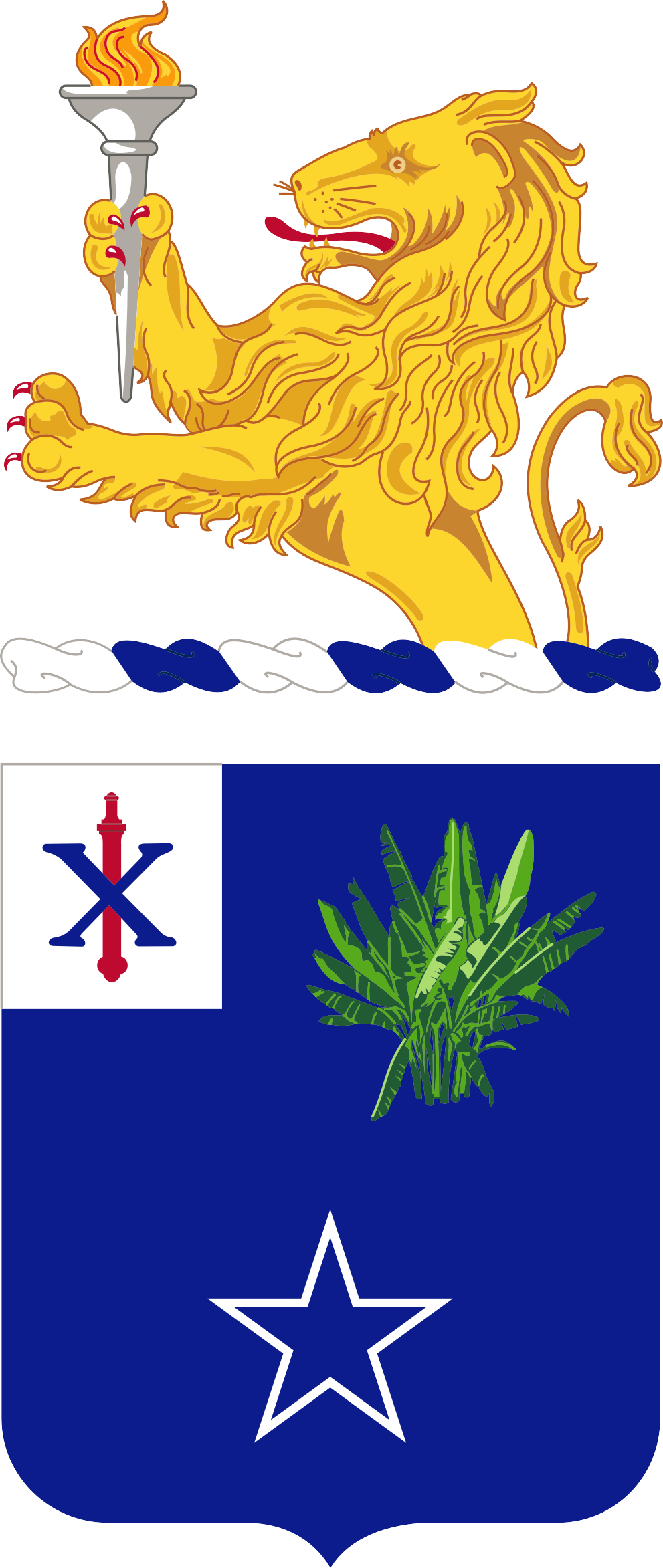
45th Infantry
"Strong to Endure"

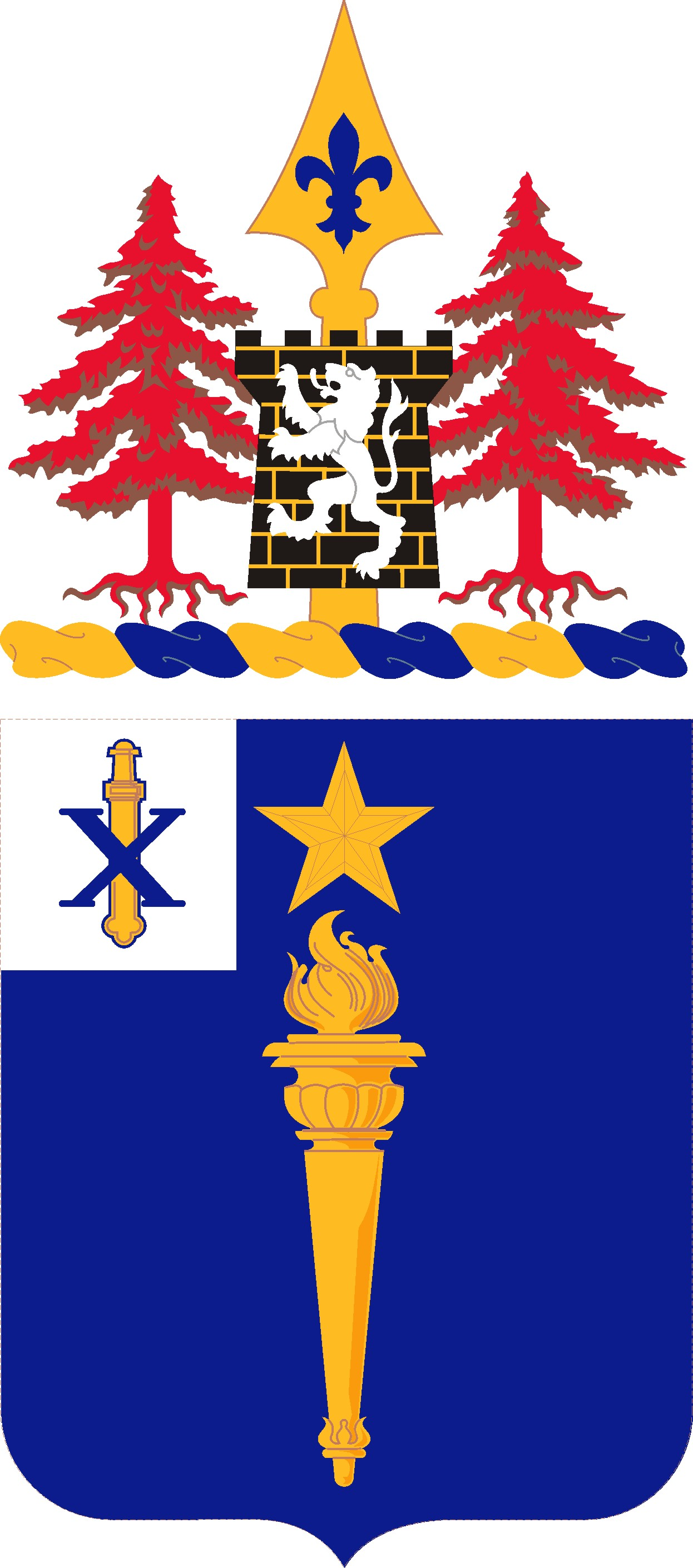
46th Infantry
"Victory’s Point"
"The Professionals"

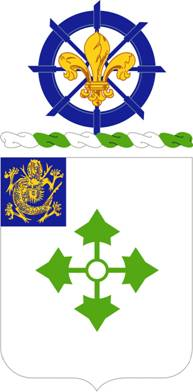
47th Infantry
"Ex Virtute Honos" (Honor comes from virtue)

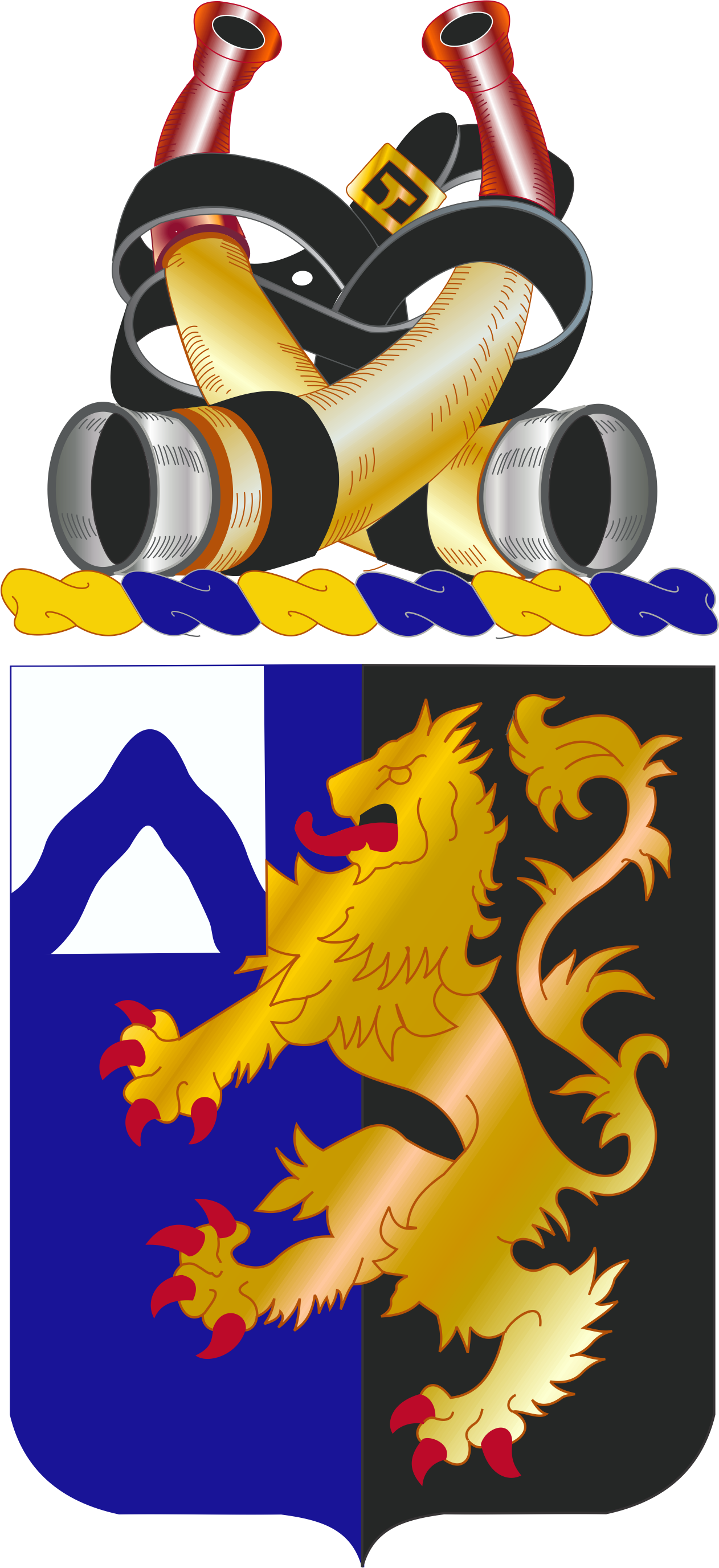
48th Infantry
"Dragoons"

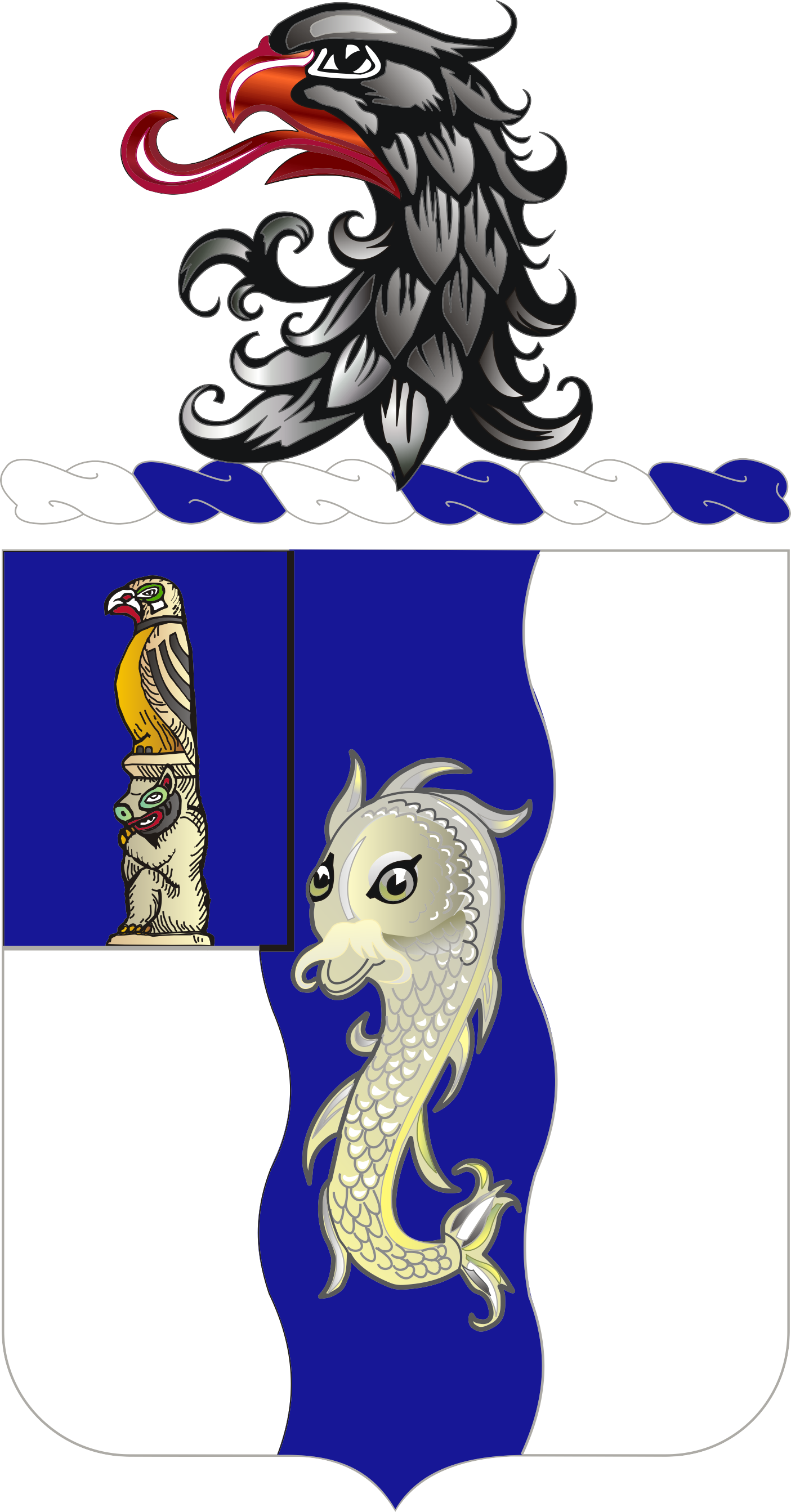
50th Infantry
"Play the Game"

51st Infantry
"I Serve"

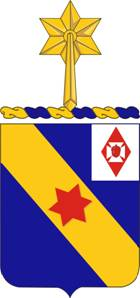
52nd Infantry
"Fortis et Certus" (Brave and True)
"Ready Rifles"

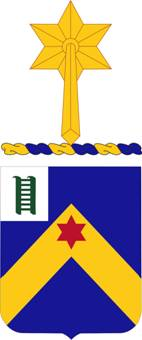
53rd Infantry
"Light, Silent, and Deadly"

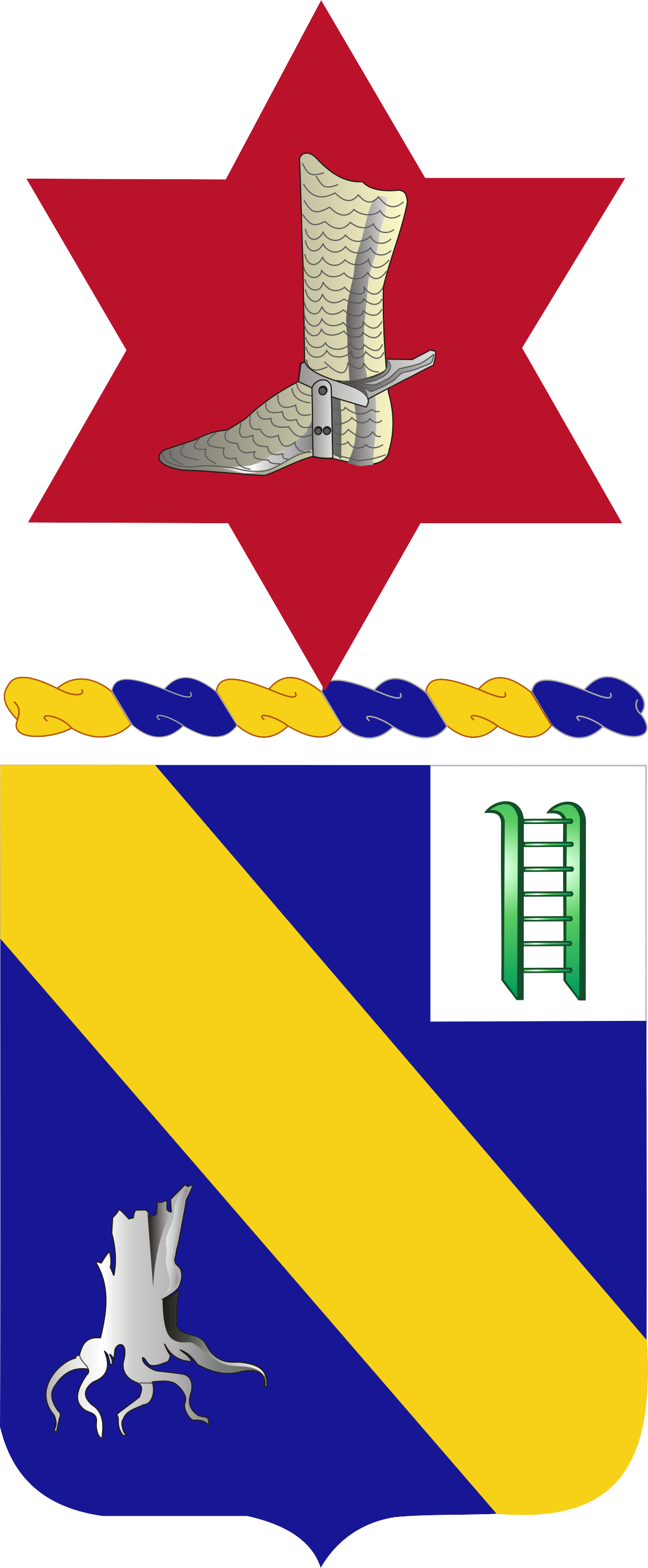
54th Infantry
"I Will Cast My Shoe Over It"

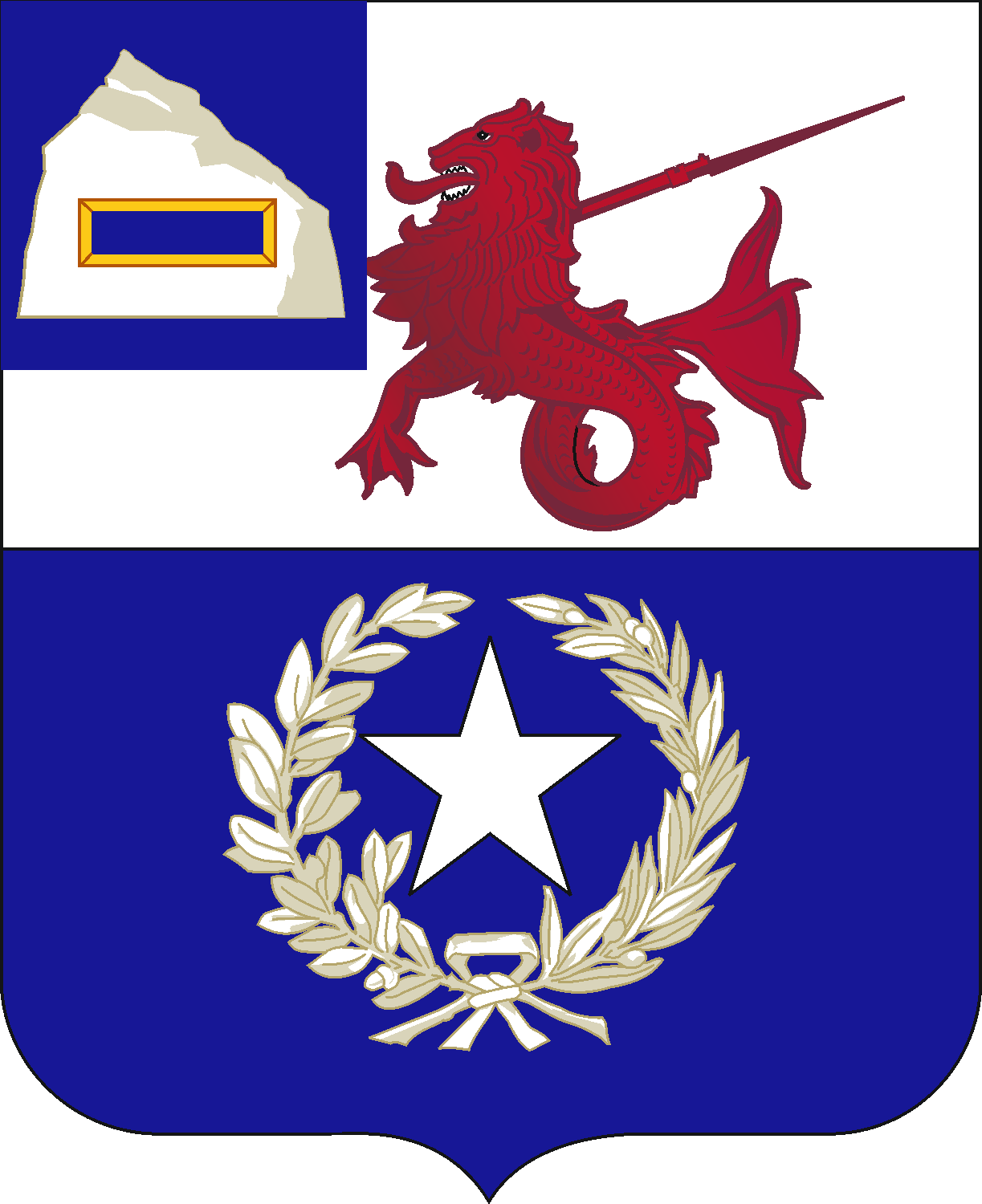
57th Infantry
"Anywhere Anytime"

58th Infantry
"Love of Country"
"Patriots"

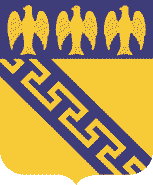
59th Infantry
"Let 'em Have It"

60th Infantry
"To the Utmost Extent of Our Power"

61st Infantry
"The Best Lead the Rest"

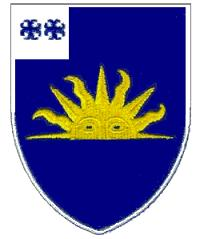
63d Infantry
"

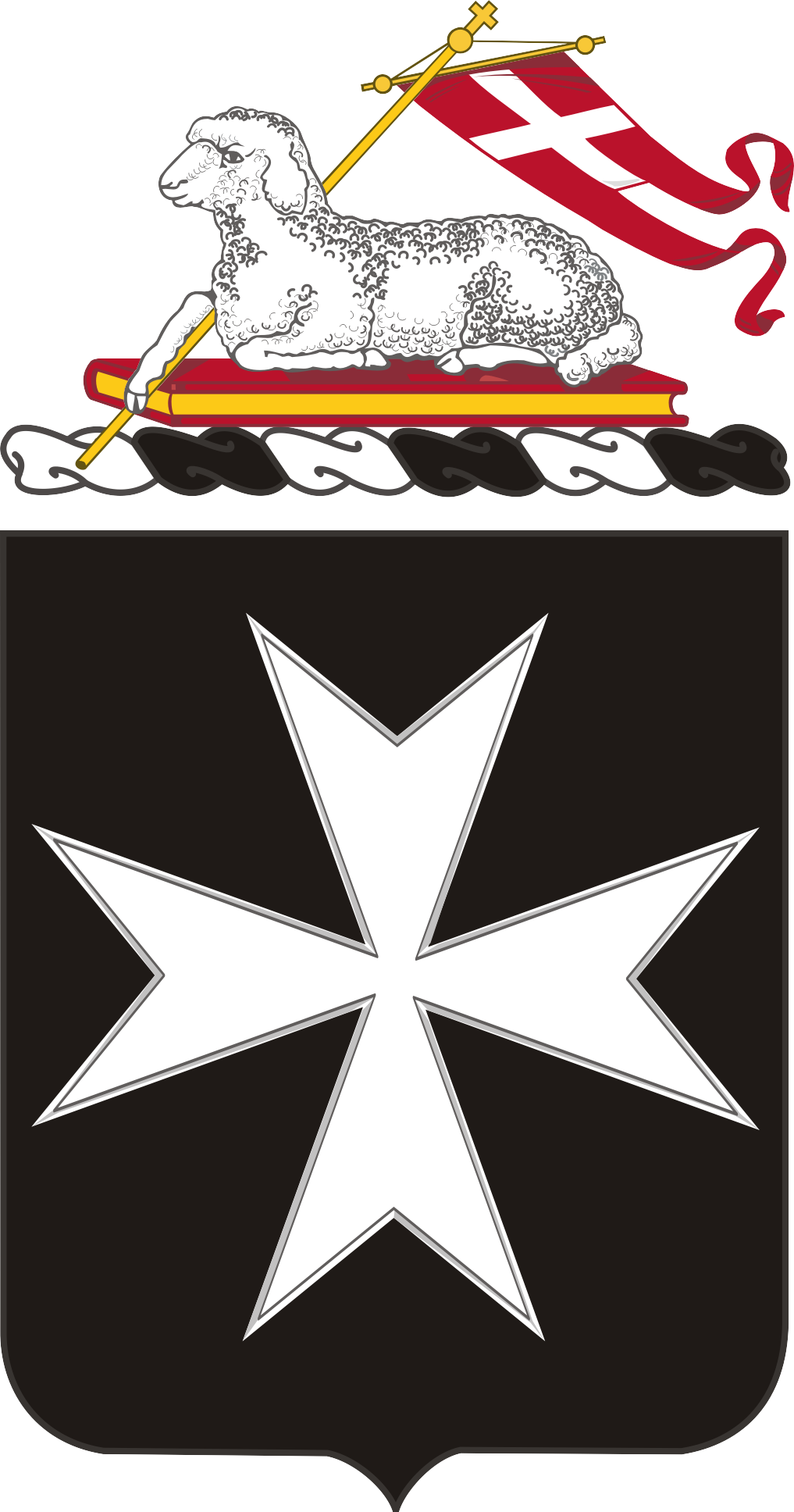
65th Infantry
"Honor and Fidelity"

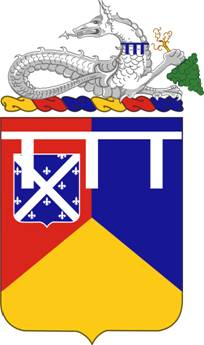
66th Infantry
(now 66th Armor)
"Semper in Hostes"

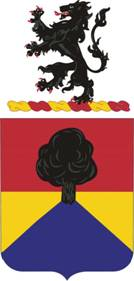
67th Infantry
(now 67th Armor)

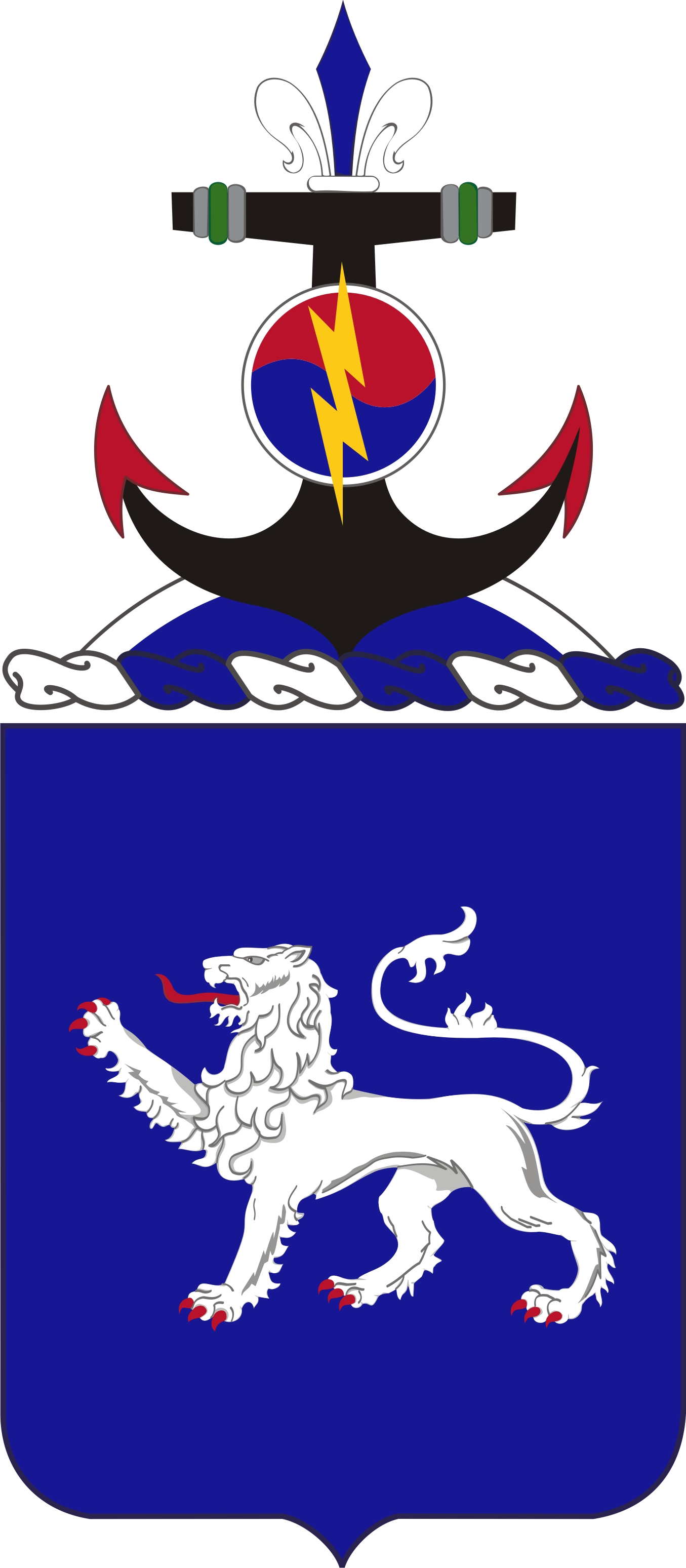
68th Infantry
(less crest)
(now 68th Armor)

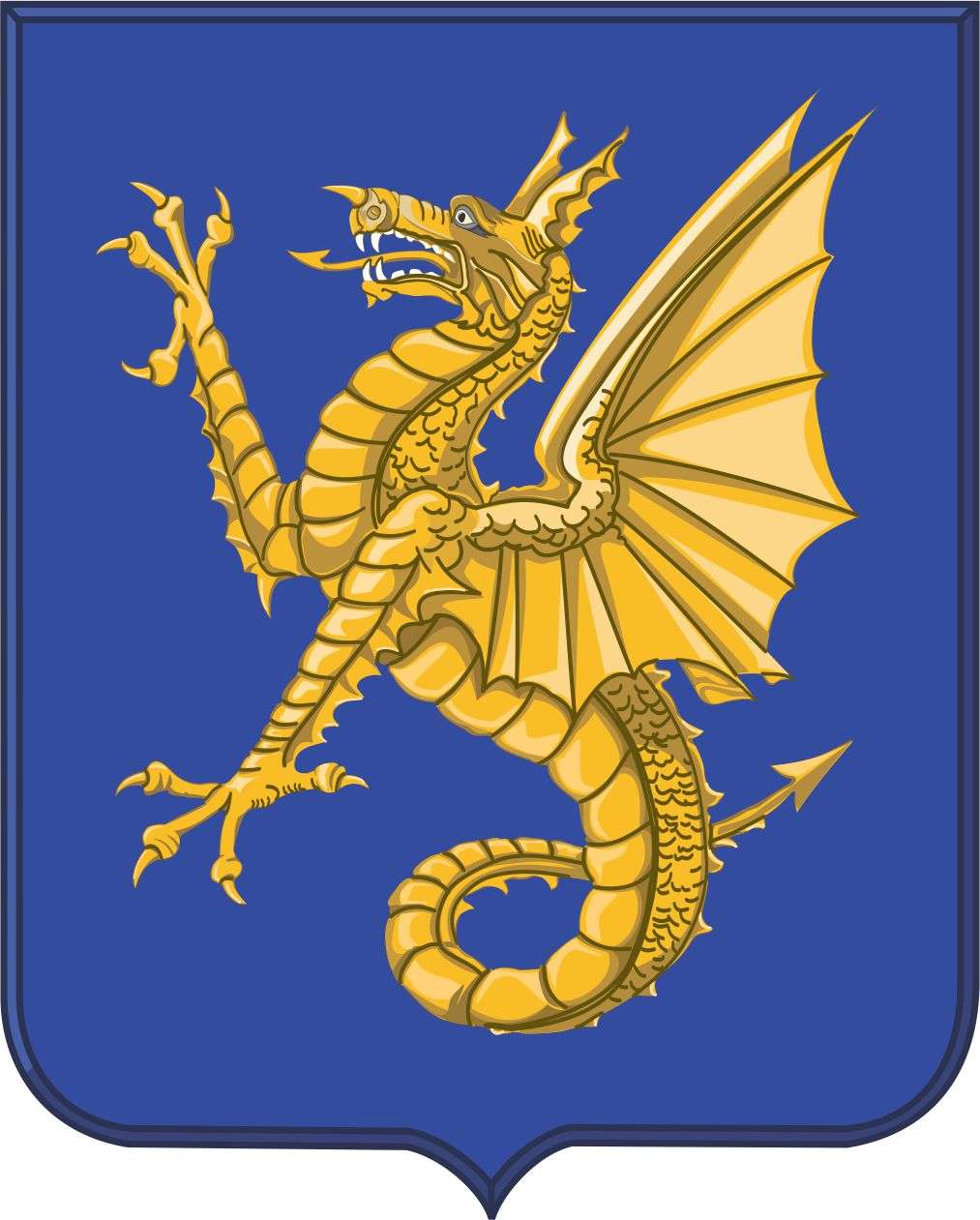
69th Infantry
"Conjunctis Viribus" (With united powers)

69th Infantry
(formerly 165th Infantry & 69th Air Defense Artillery)
"Gentle When Stroked, Fierce When Provoked"

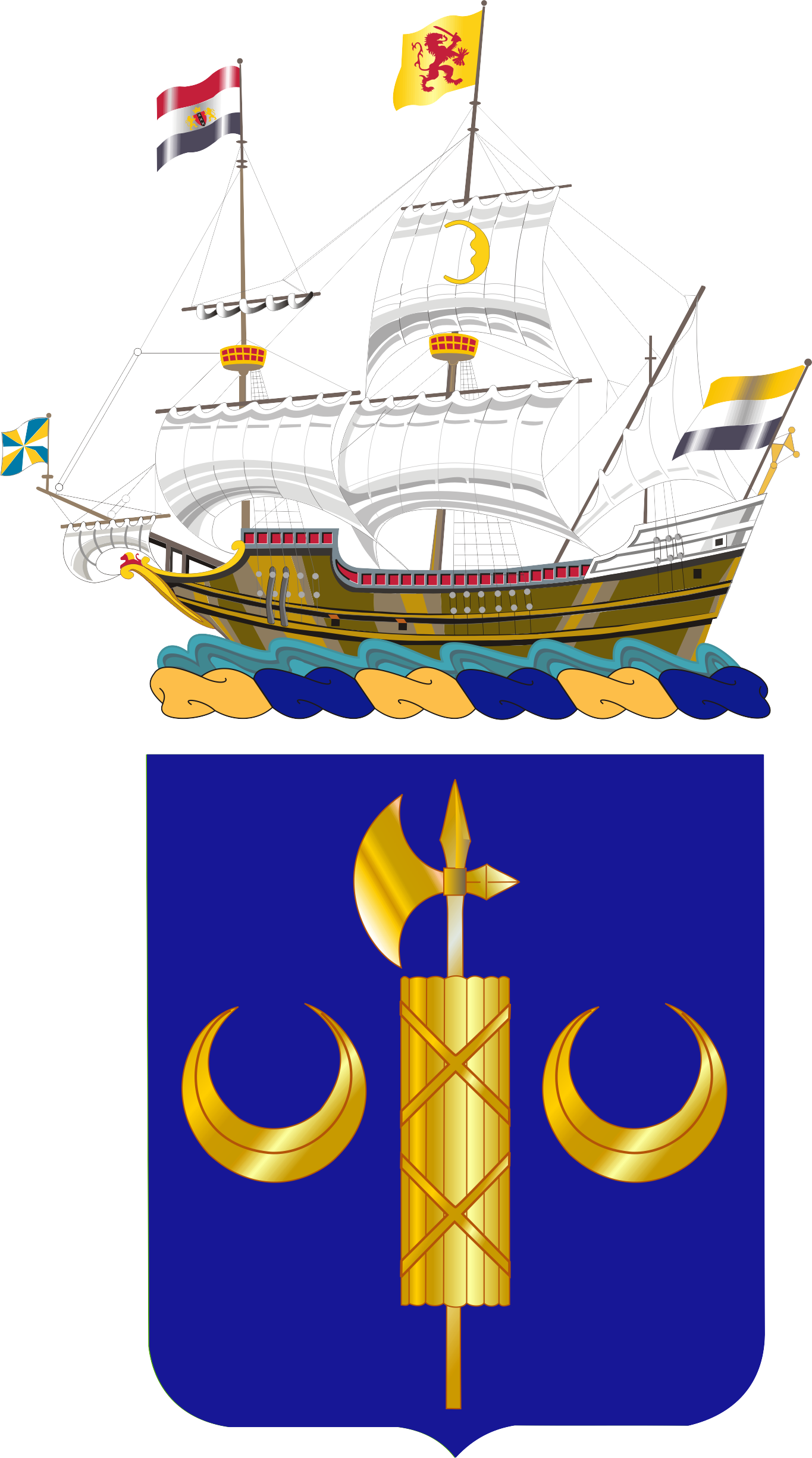
71st Infantry
"Prepared to guard"

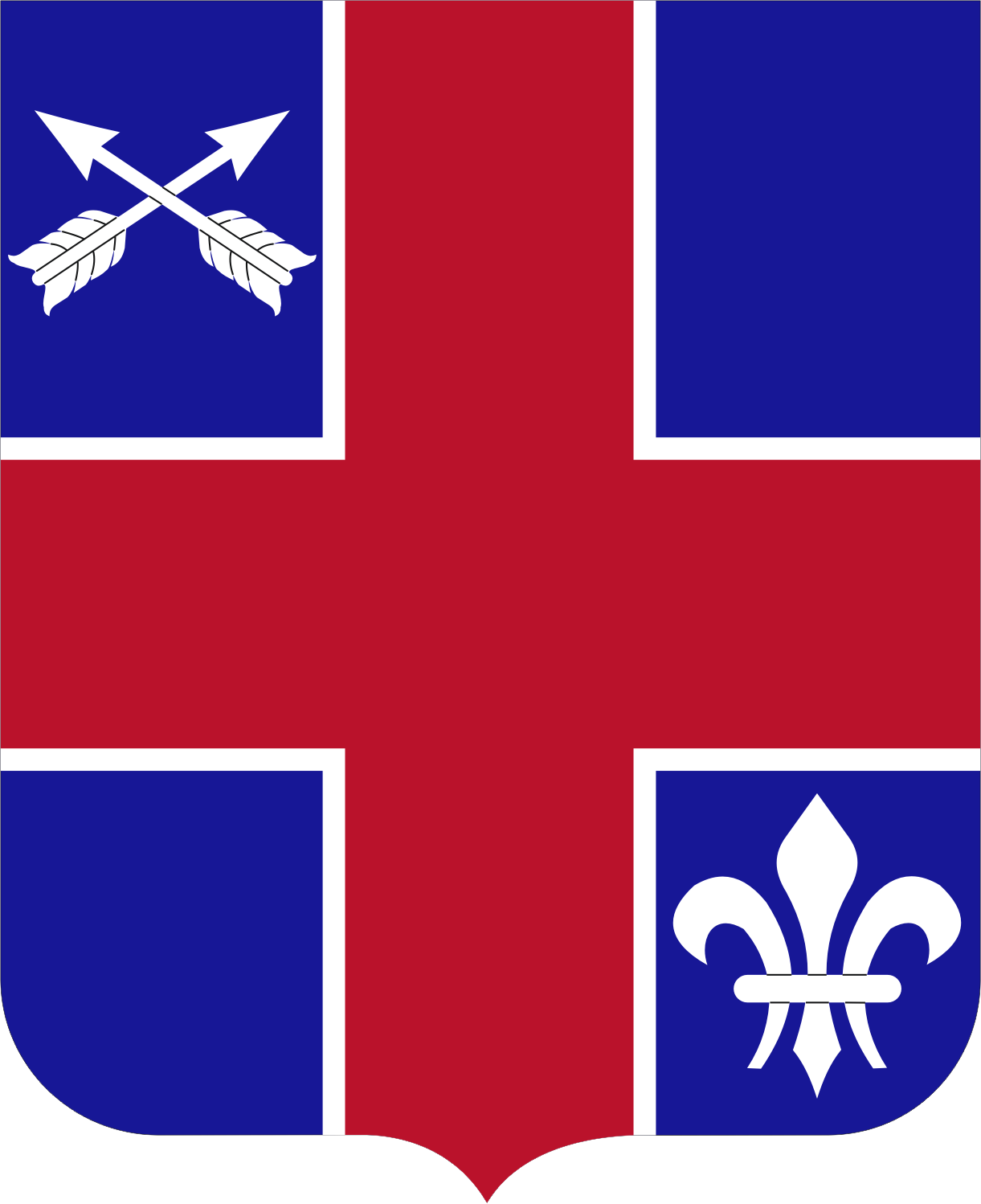
74th Infantry
"Audax et Fortis" (Bold and Brave)

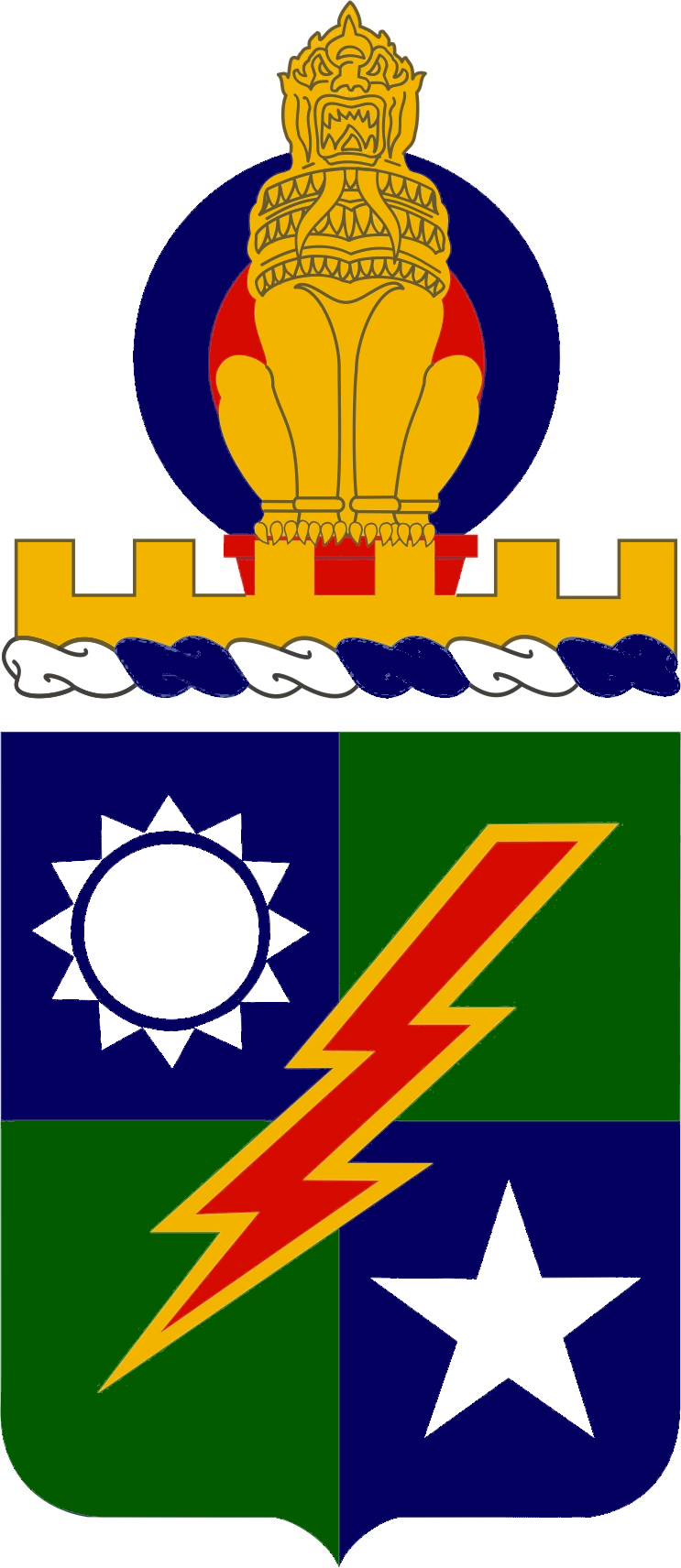
75th Infantry
(now 75th Ranger)
"Sua Sponte" (Of Their Own Accord)

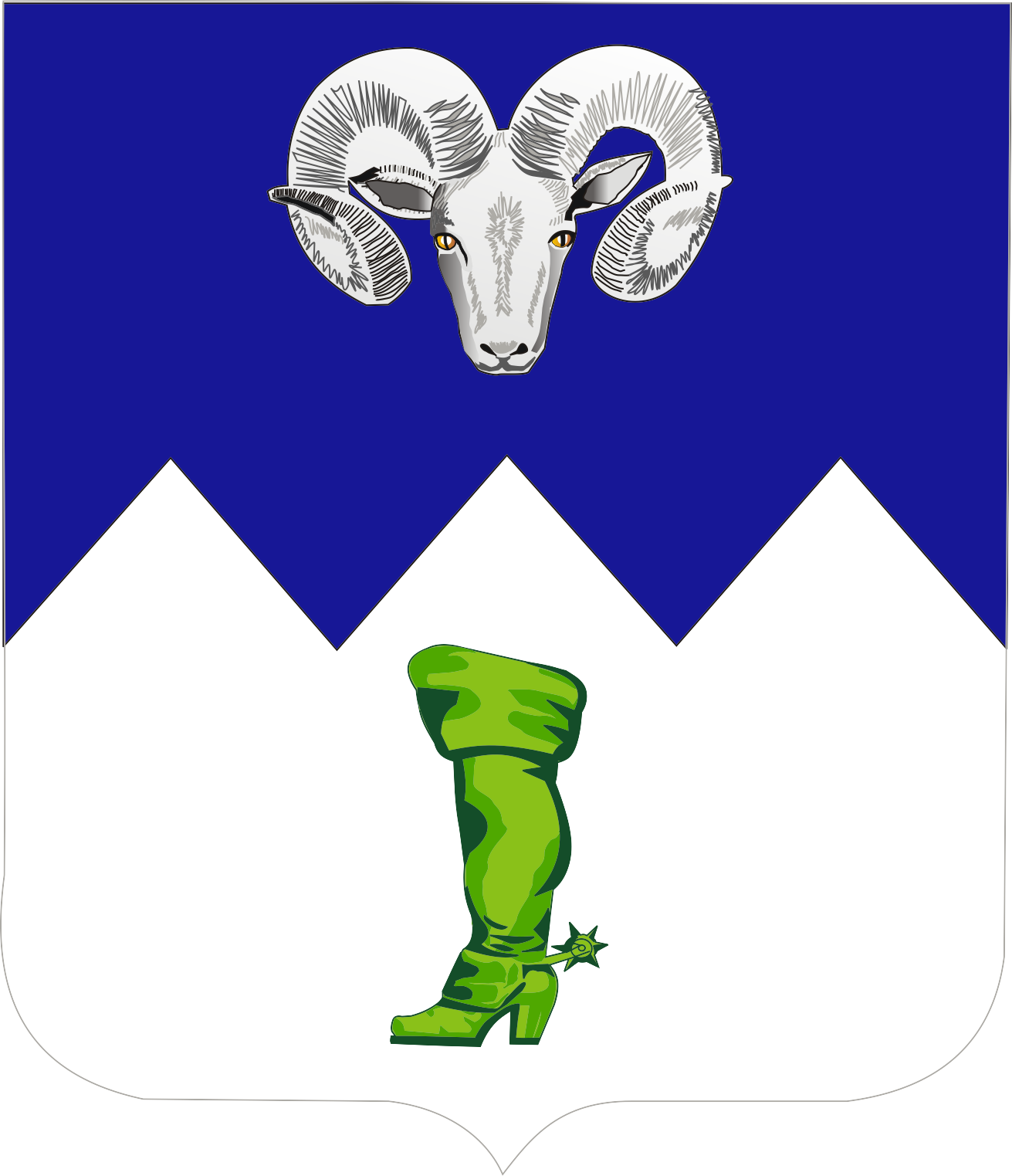
85th Infantry
"Fix Bayonets"

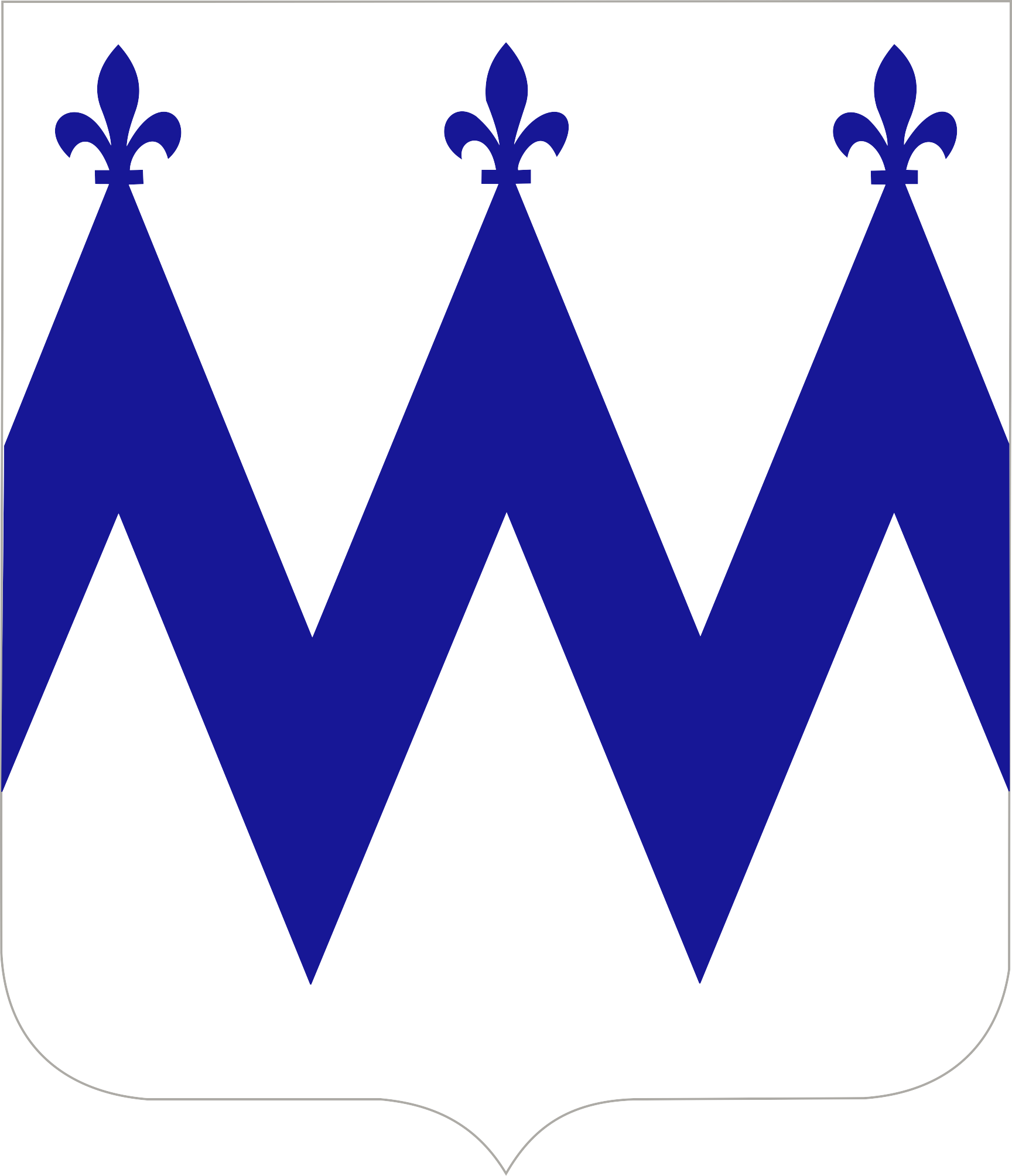
86th Infantry
"Courage and Dependability"

87th Infantry
"Vires Montesque Vincimus" (We Overcome Might and Mountains)

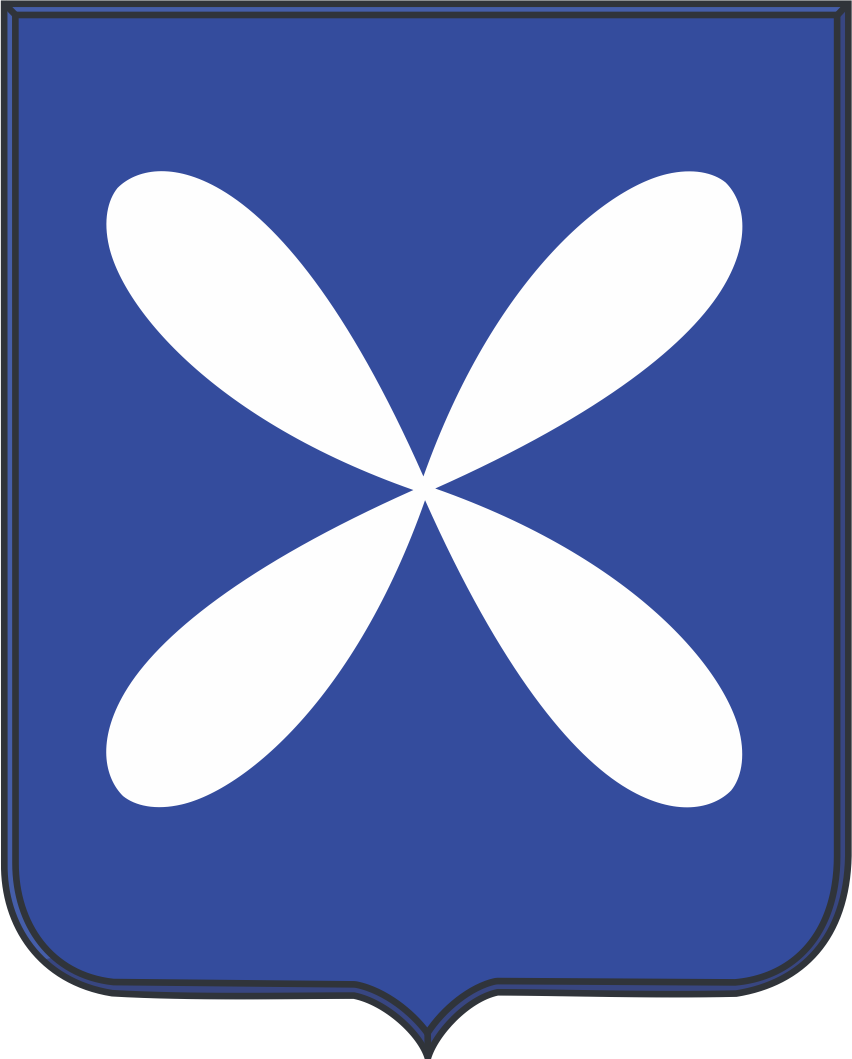
88th Infantry
"Ride the Storm"

=== 101 to 300 ===
101st Infantry
"Sempter Paratus" (Always Prepared)

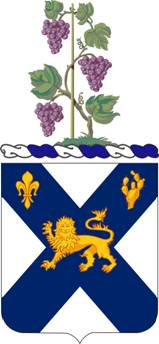
102nd Infantry
"Stand Forth"

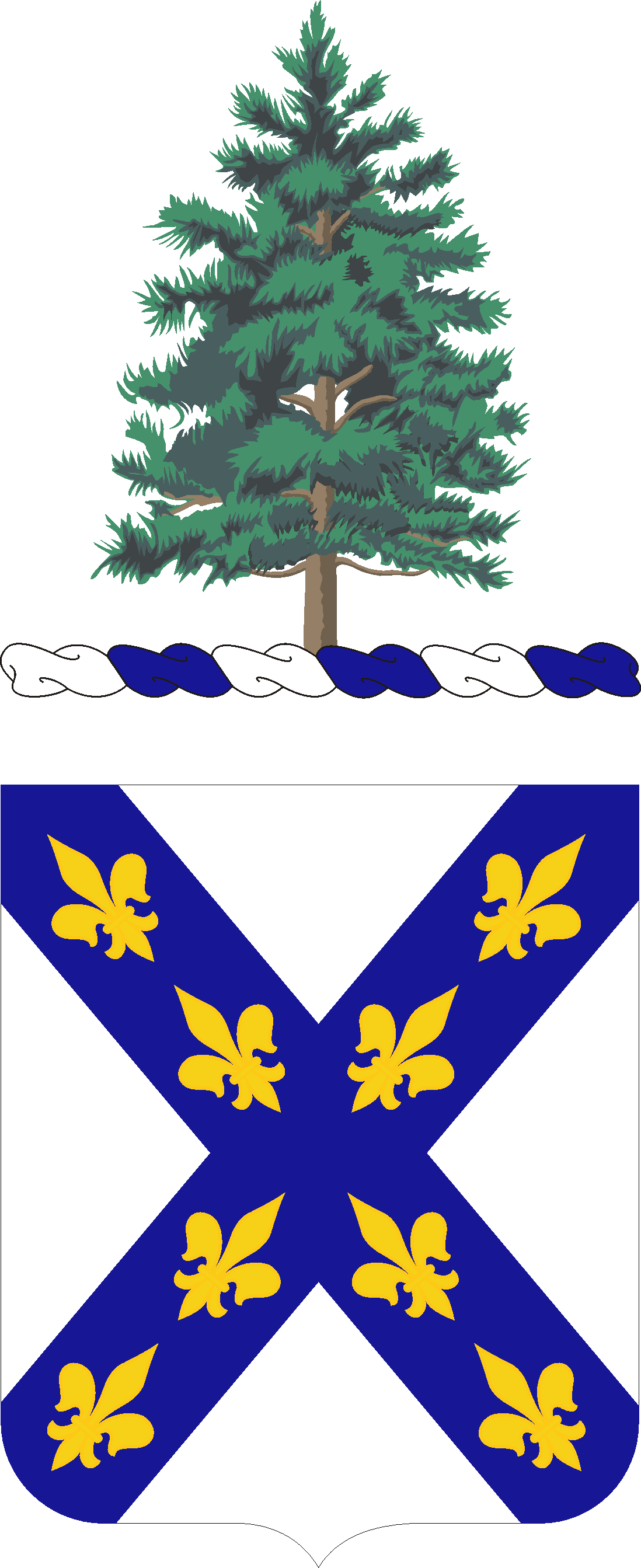
103rd Infantry
(now 133rd Engineer Battalion)
"To the Last Man"

104th Infantry
"Fortitude et Courage" (Fortitude and Courage)

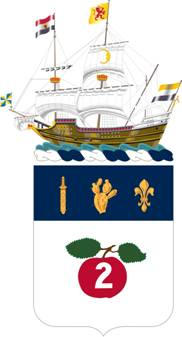
105th Infantry
"Possumus et vincemus" (We Are Able and Will Conquer)

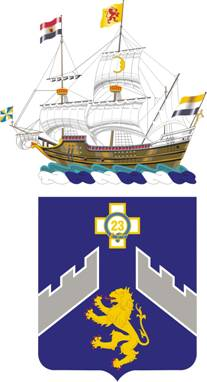
106th Infantry
"Fidelis Et Constans" (Faithful and Constant)

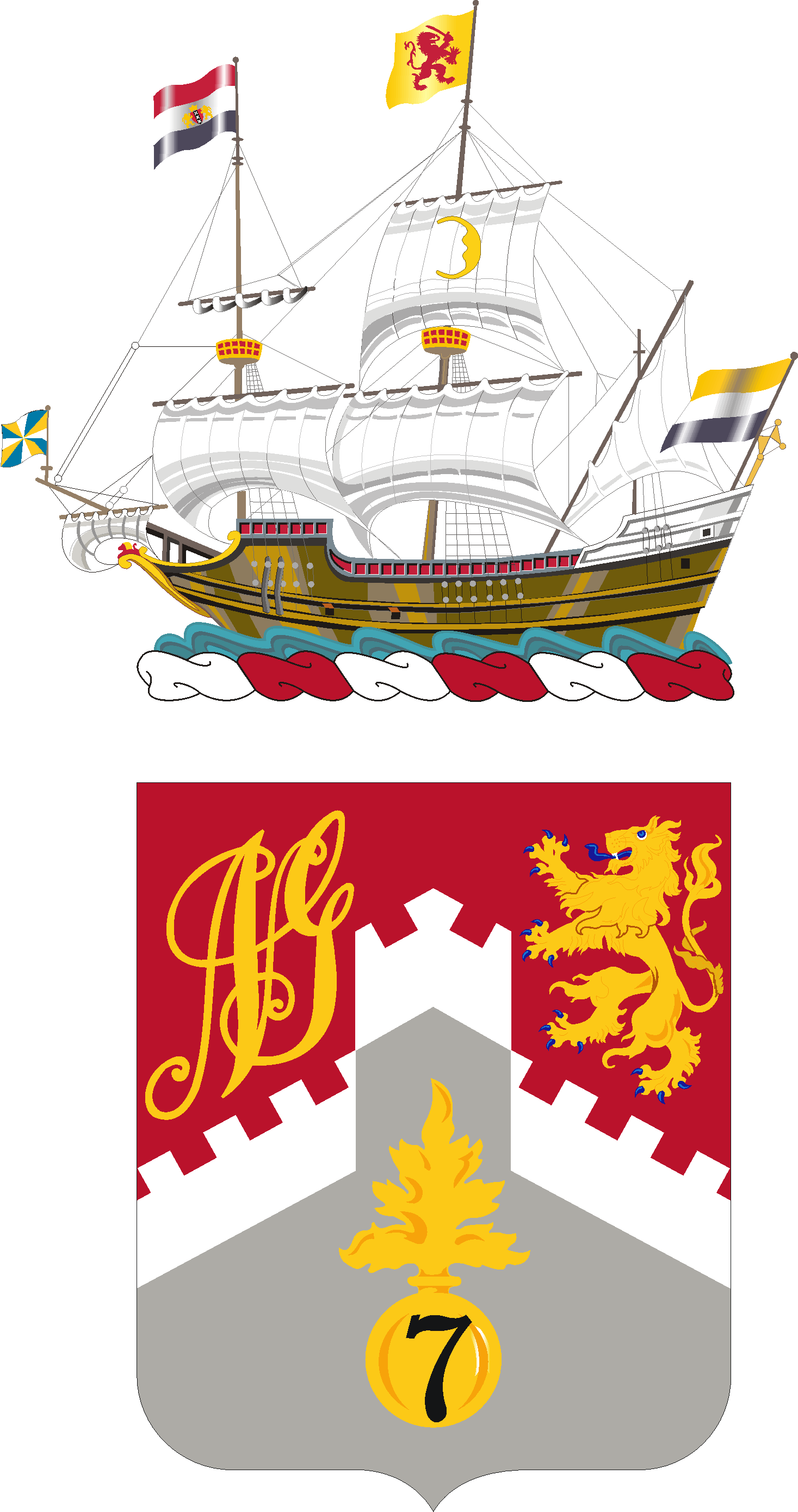
107th Infantry
"Pro Patria et Gloria" (For Country and Glory)

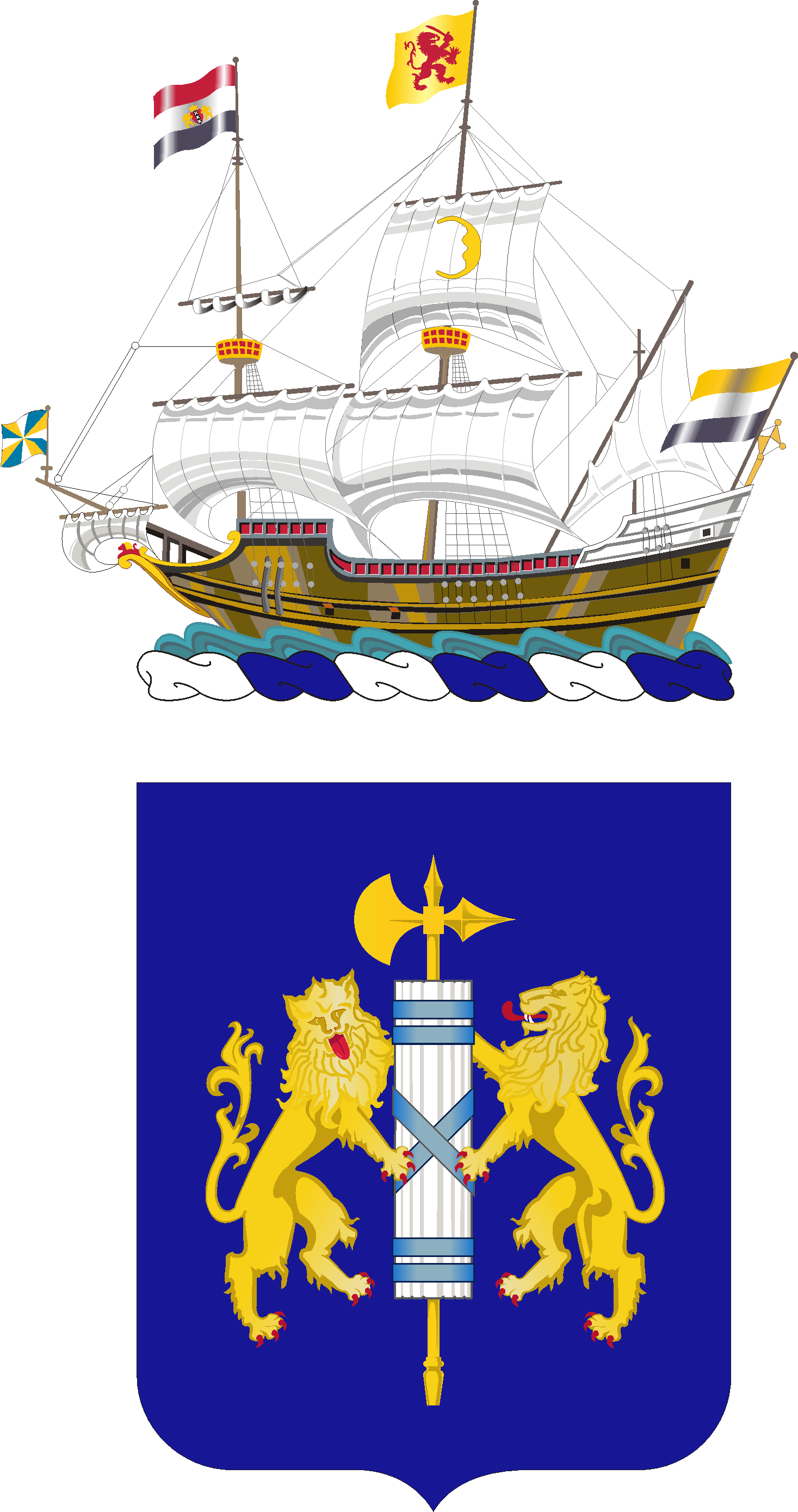
108th Infantry
"Virtute Non Verbis"

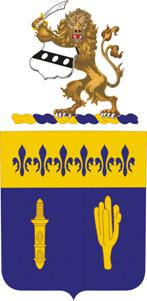
109th Infantry
"Cives Arma Ferant" (Let the Citizens Bear Arms)

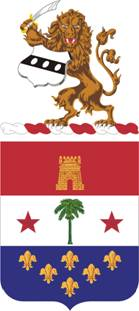
110th Infantry
"Cuiusque Devotio Est Vis Regimenti" (The Devotion of Each Is the Strength of the Regiment)

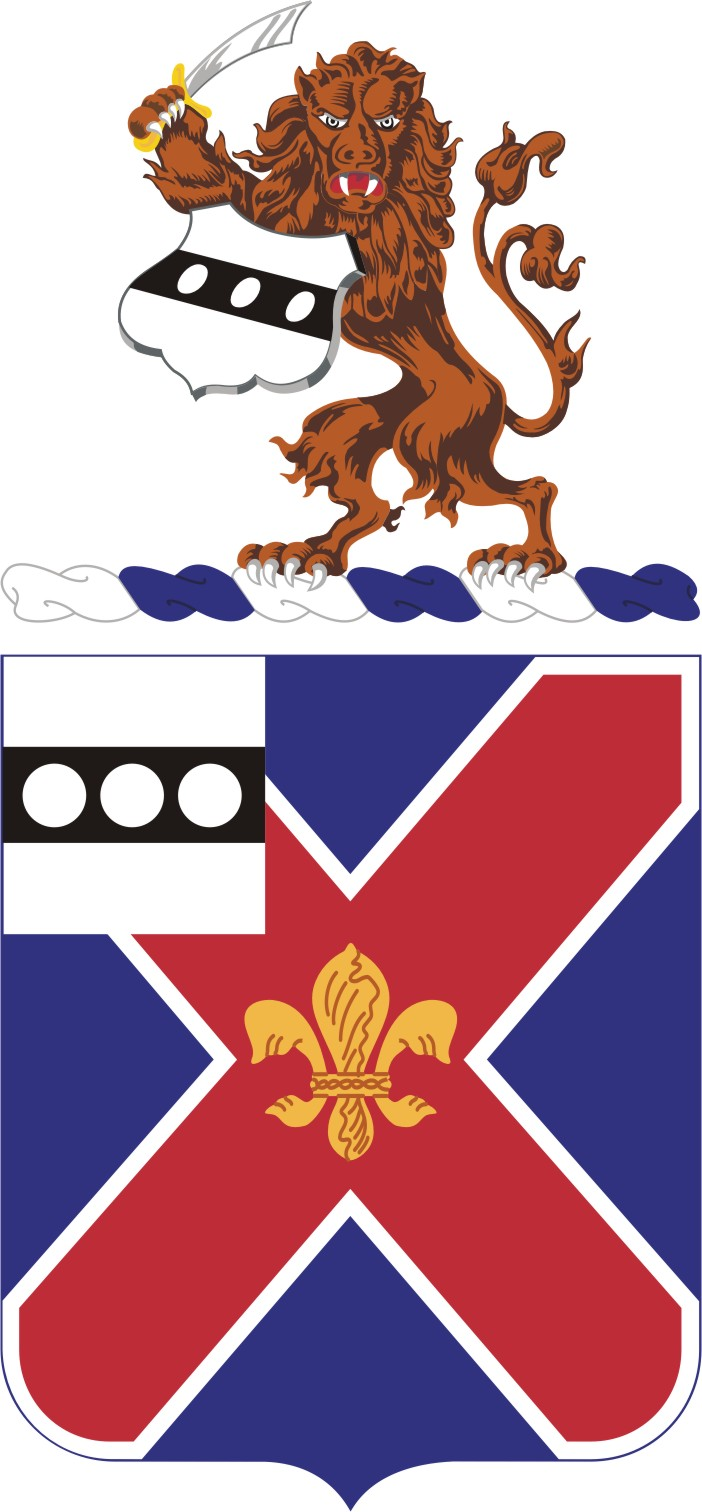
111th Infantry
"Nulla Vestigia Retroraum" (No Steps Backward)

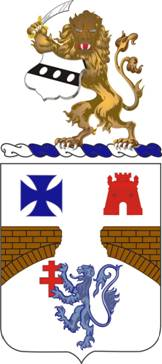
112th Infantry
"Strive, Obey, Endure"

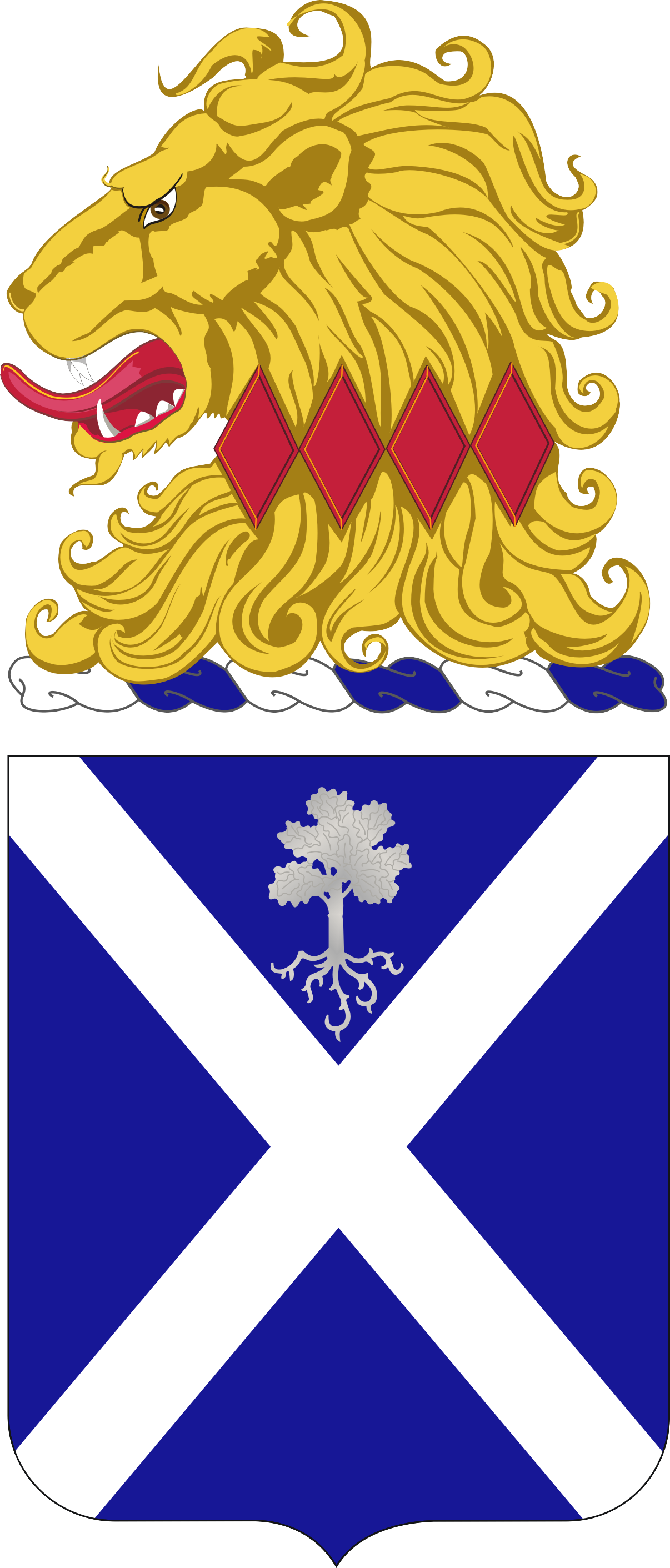
113th Infantry
"Fidelis et Fortis" (Faithful and Brave)

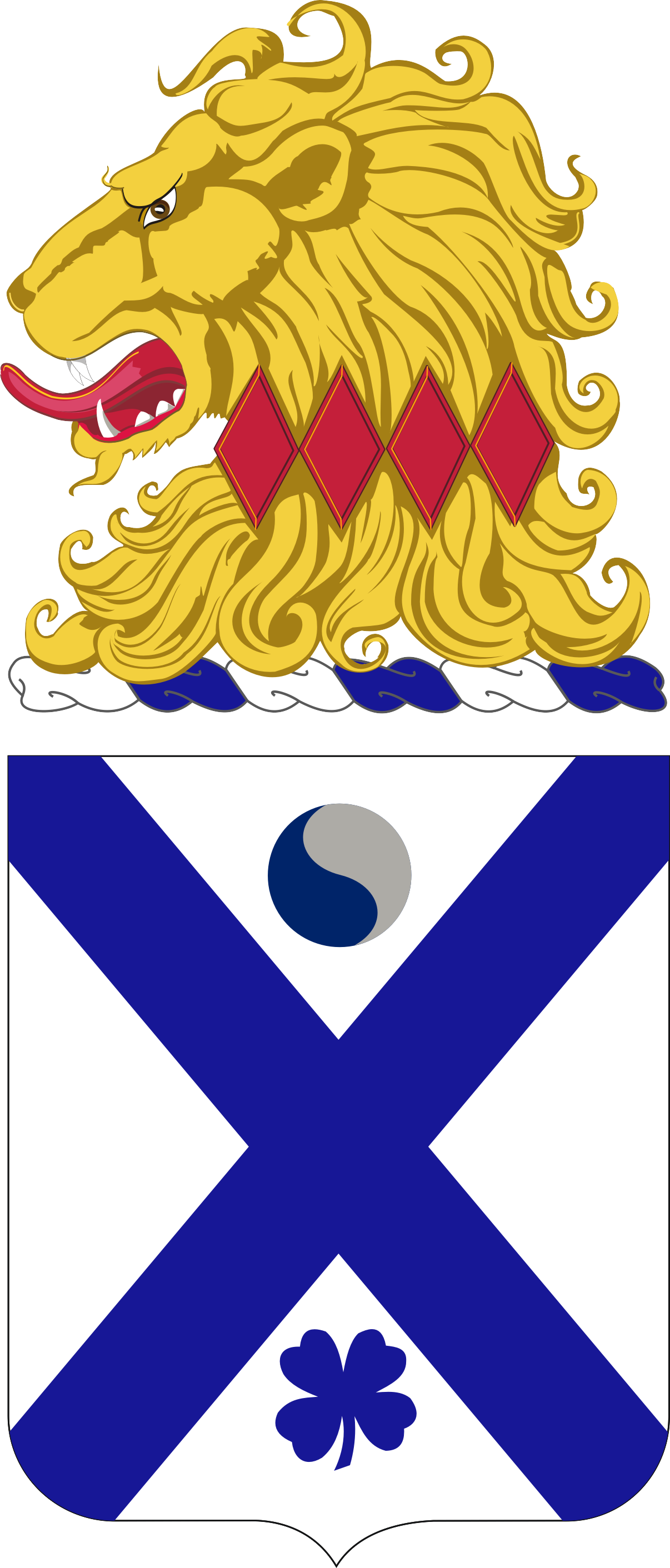
114th Infantry
"In Omnia Paratus"

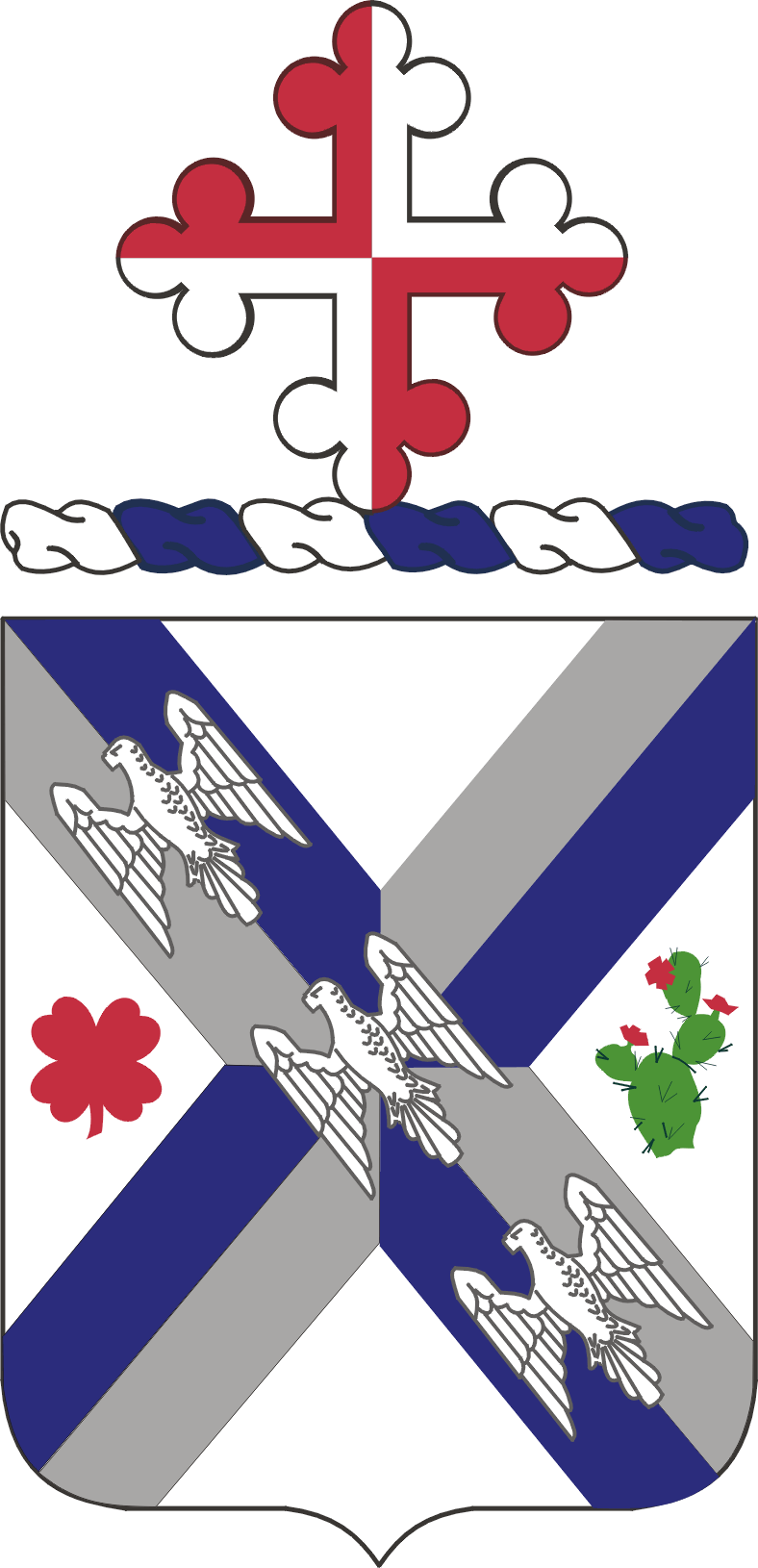
115th Infantry
"Rally Round the Flag"

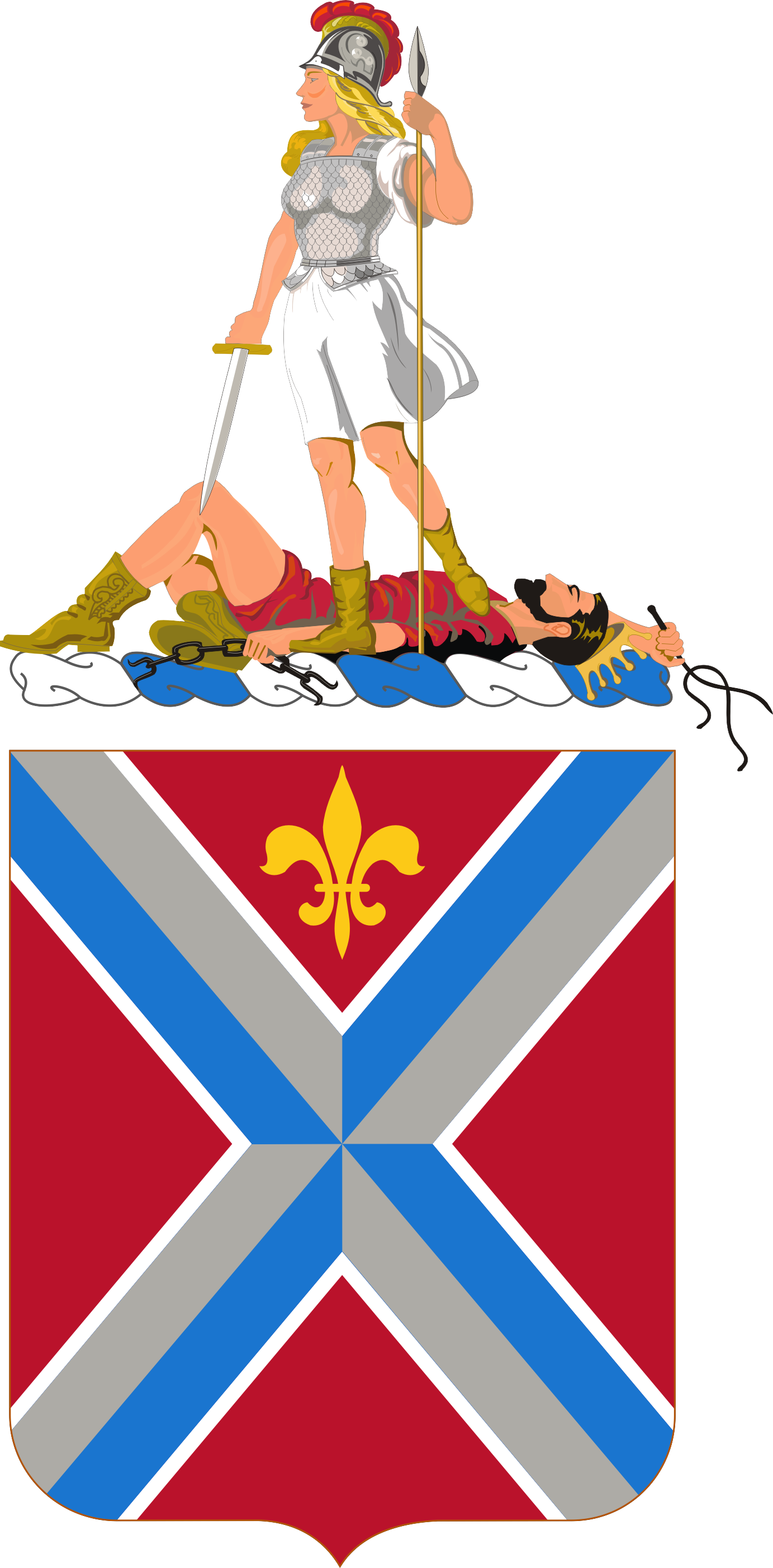
116th Infantry
"Ever Forward"

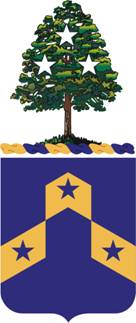
117th Infantry
"Break Through"

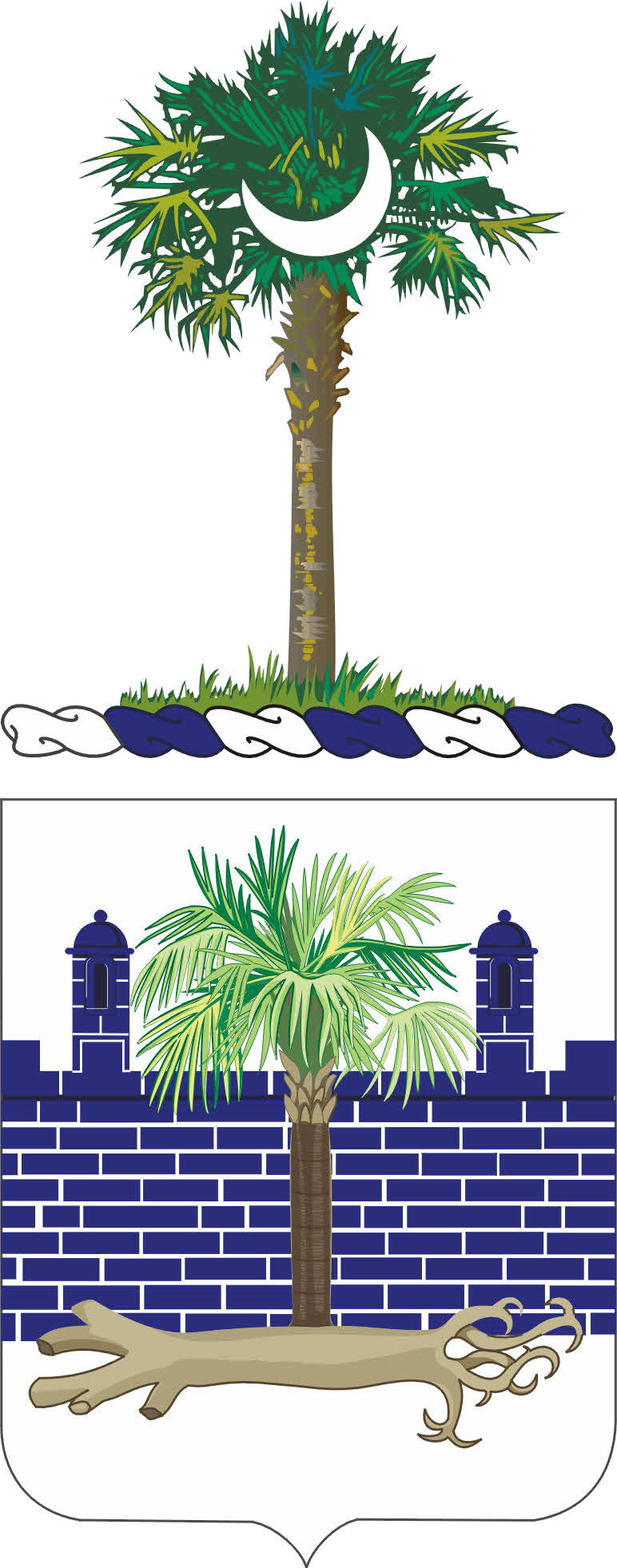
118th Infantry
"Wherever My Country Calls"

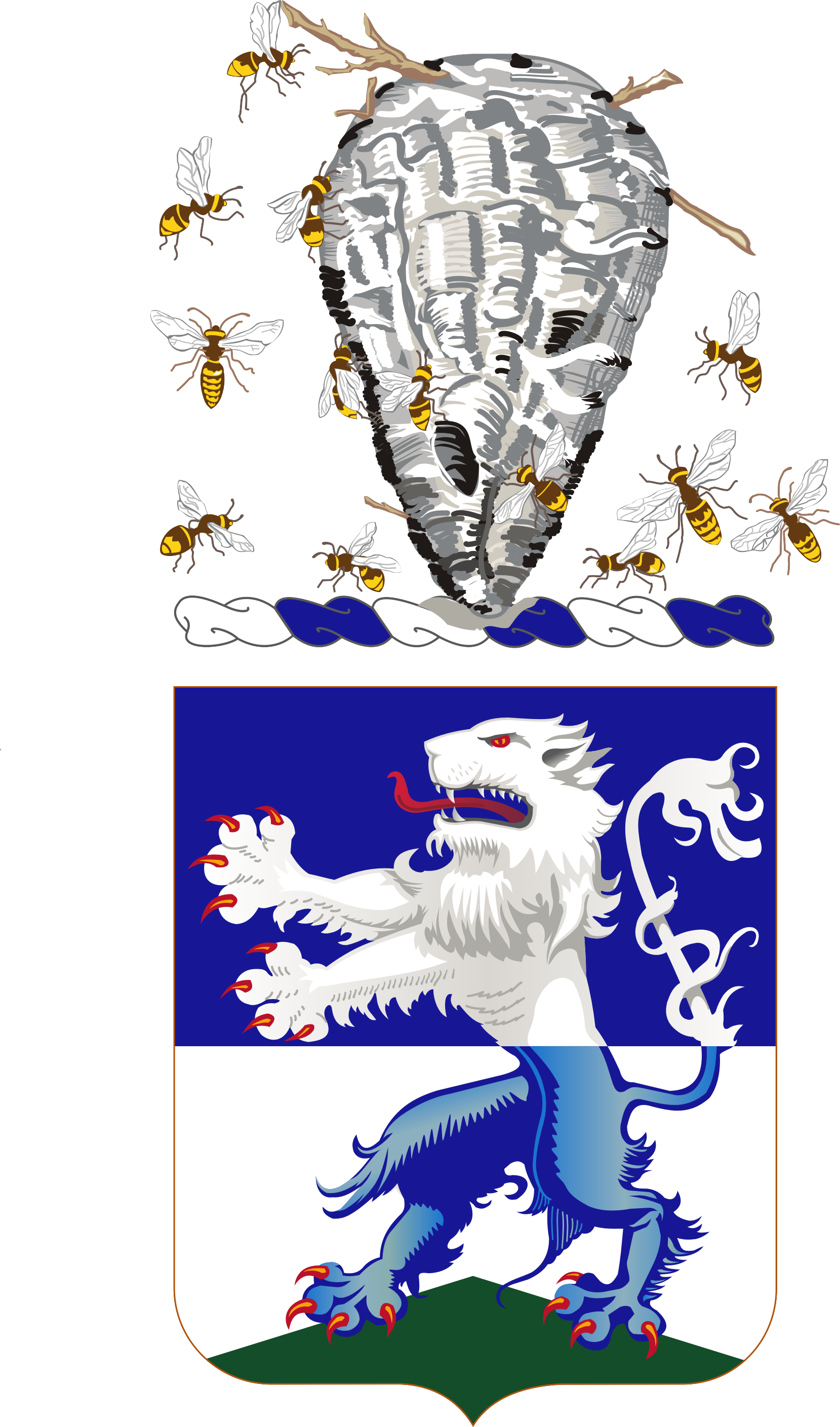
119th Infantry
"Undaunted"

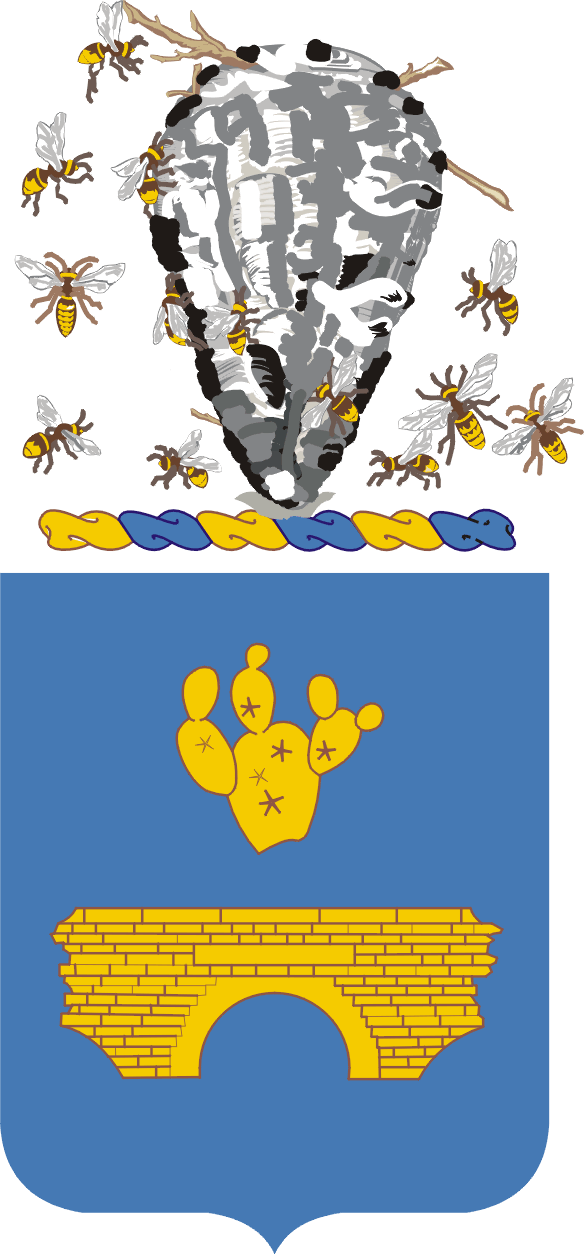
120th Infantry
"Virtus Incendit Vires" (Virtues Kindles Strength)

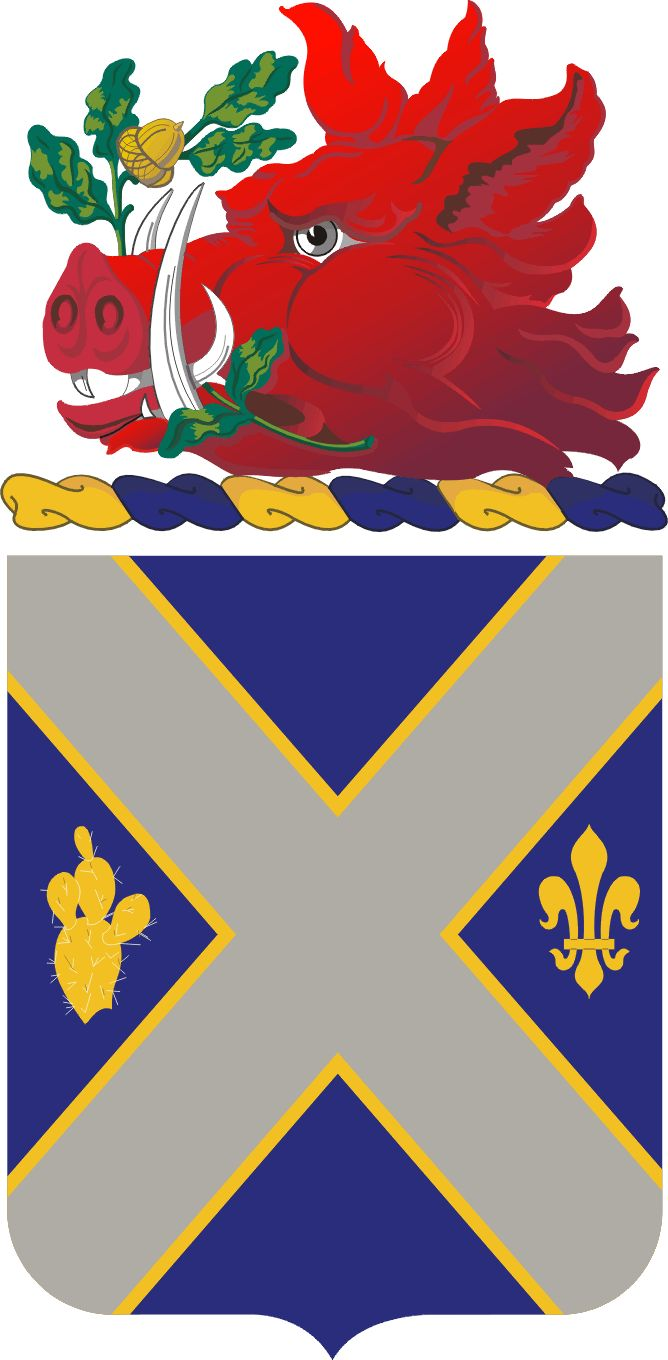
121st Infantry
"Faciendum Est" (It Shall Be Done)

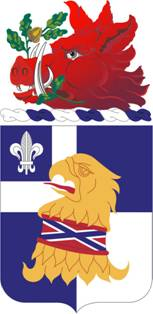
122nd Infantry
"Sentinel of Freedom"

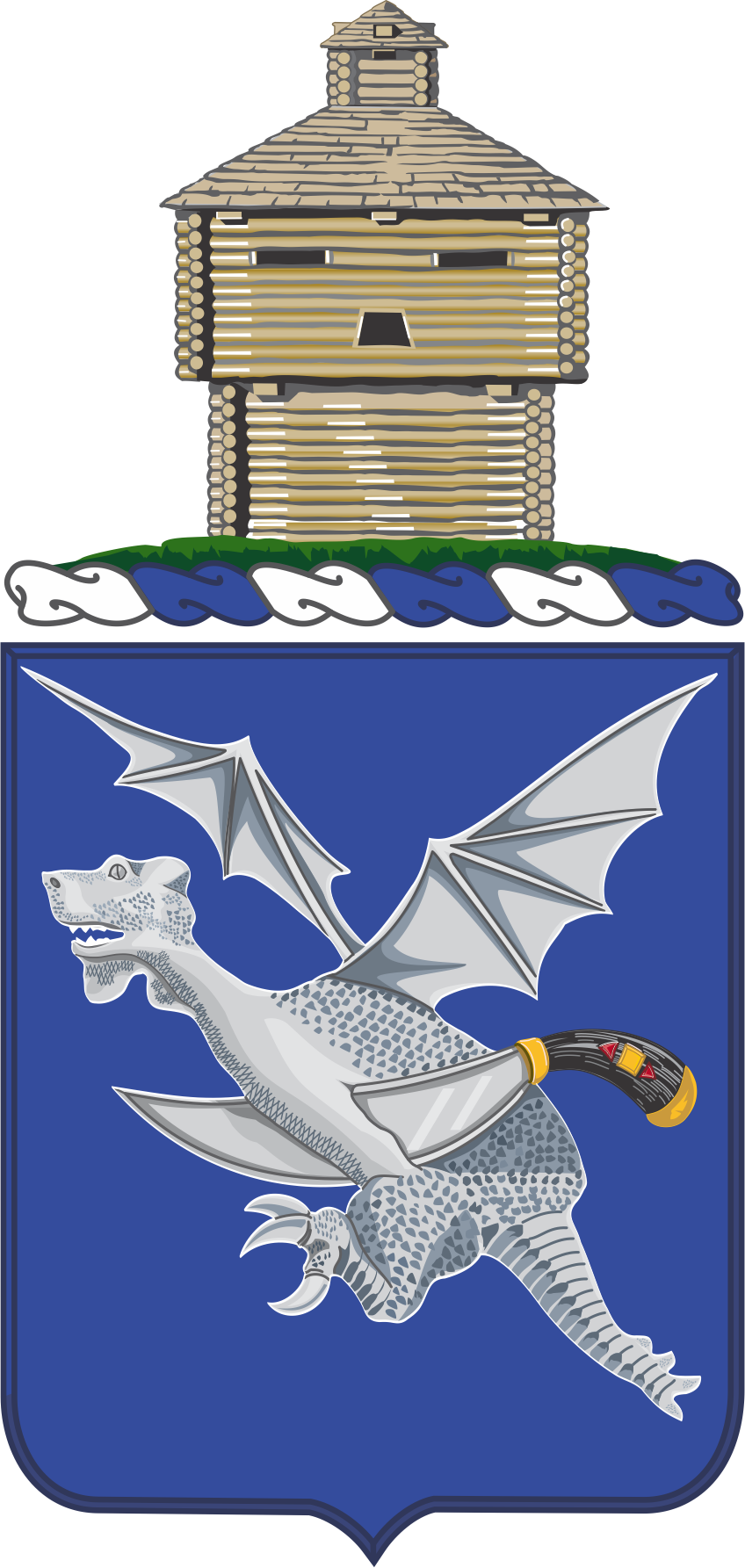
123rd Infantry
"1,2,3, GO"

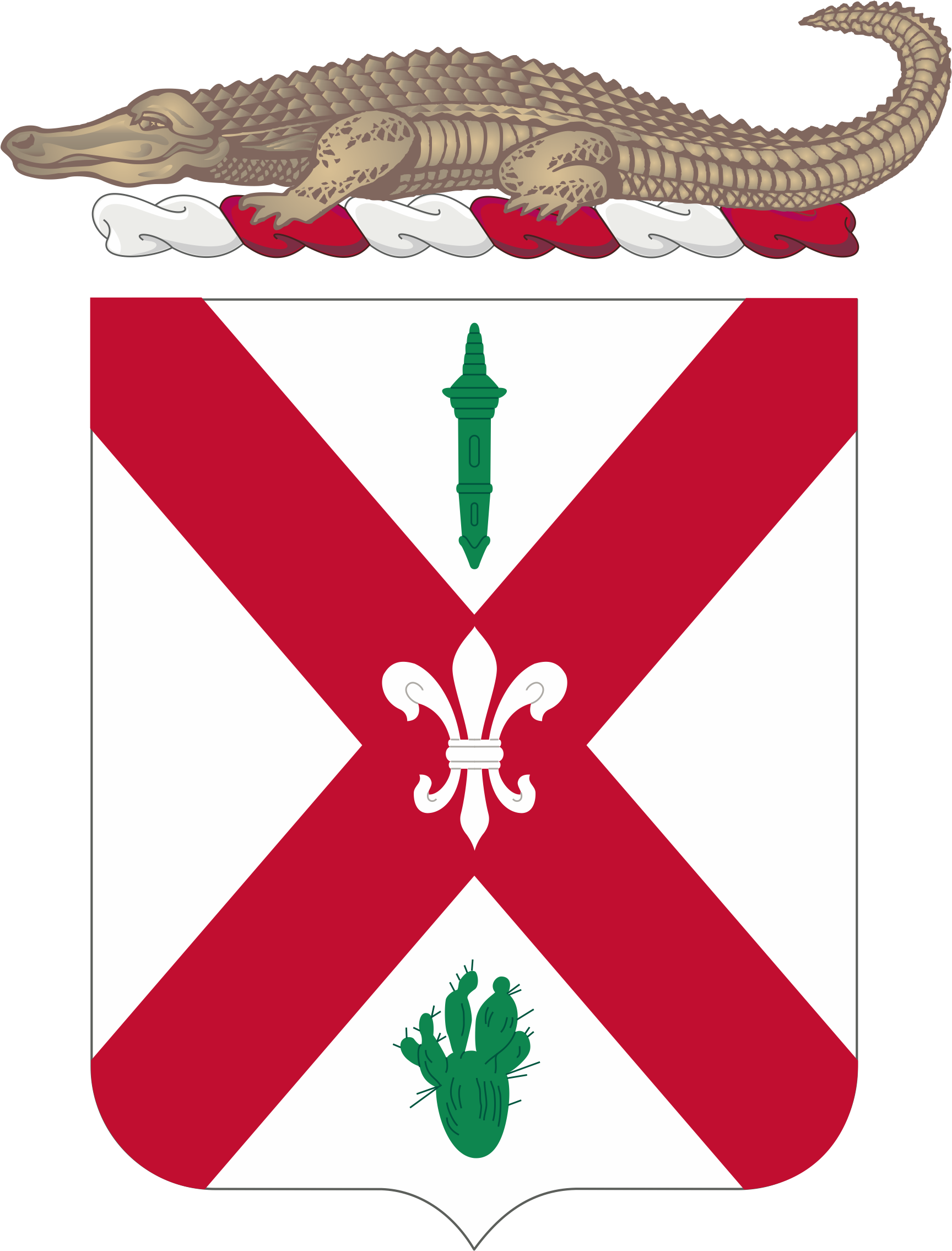
124th Infantry
"Florida and Country"

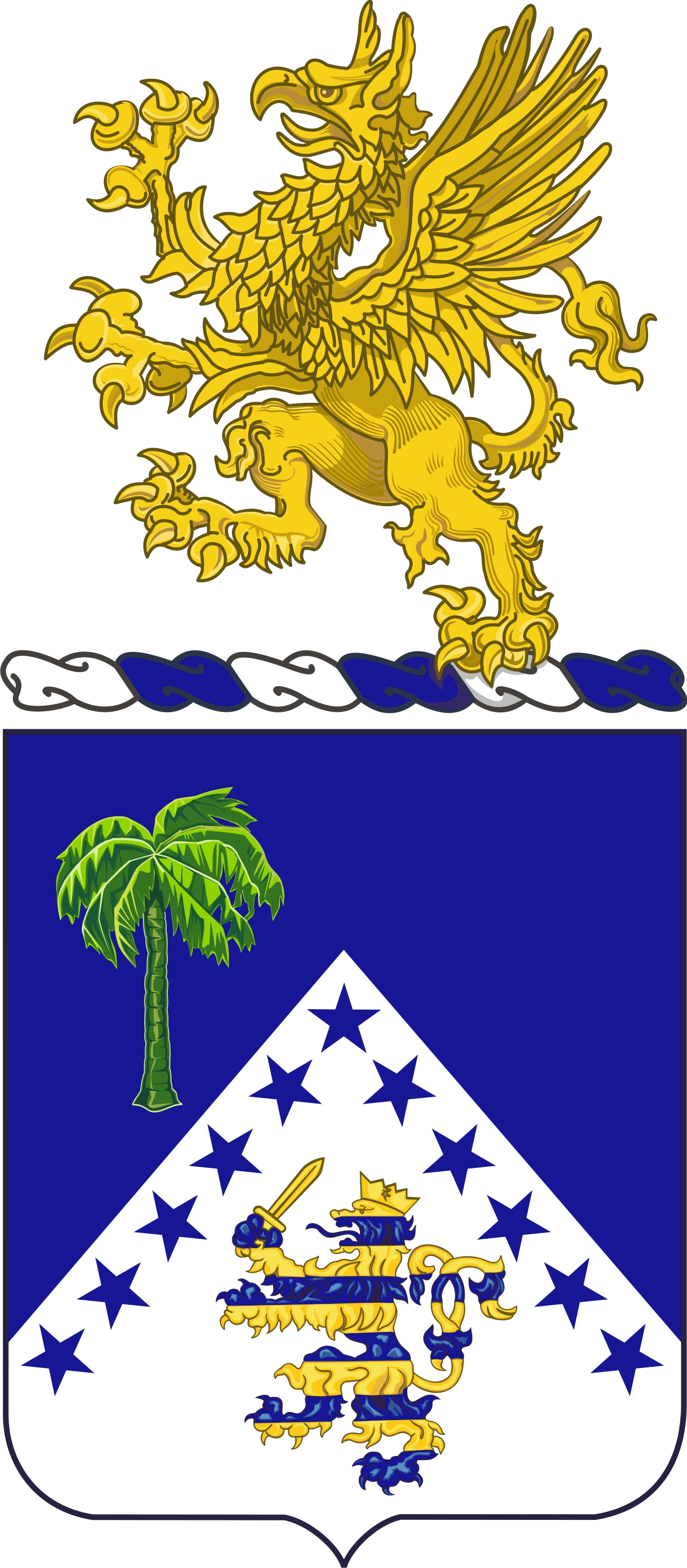
125th Infantry
"Yield to None"

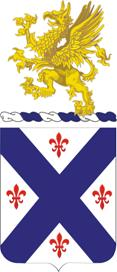
126th Infantry
(formerly 126th Armor & 126th Cavalry)
"Courage Sans Peur" (Courage Without Fear)

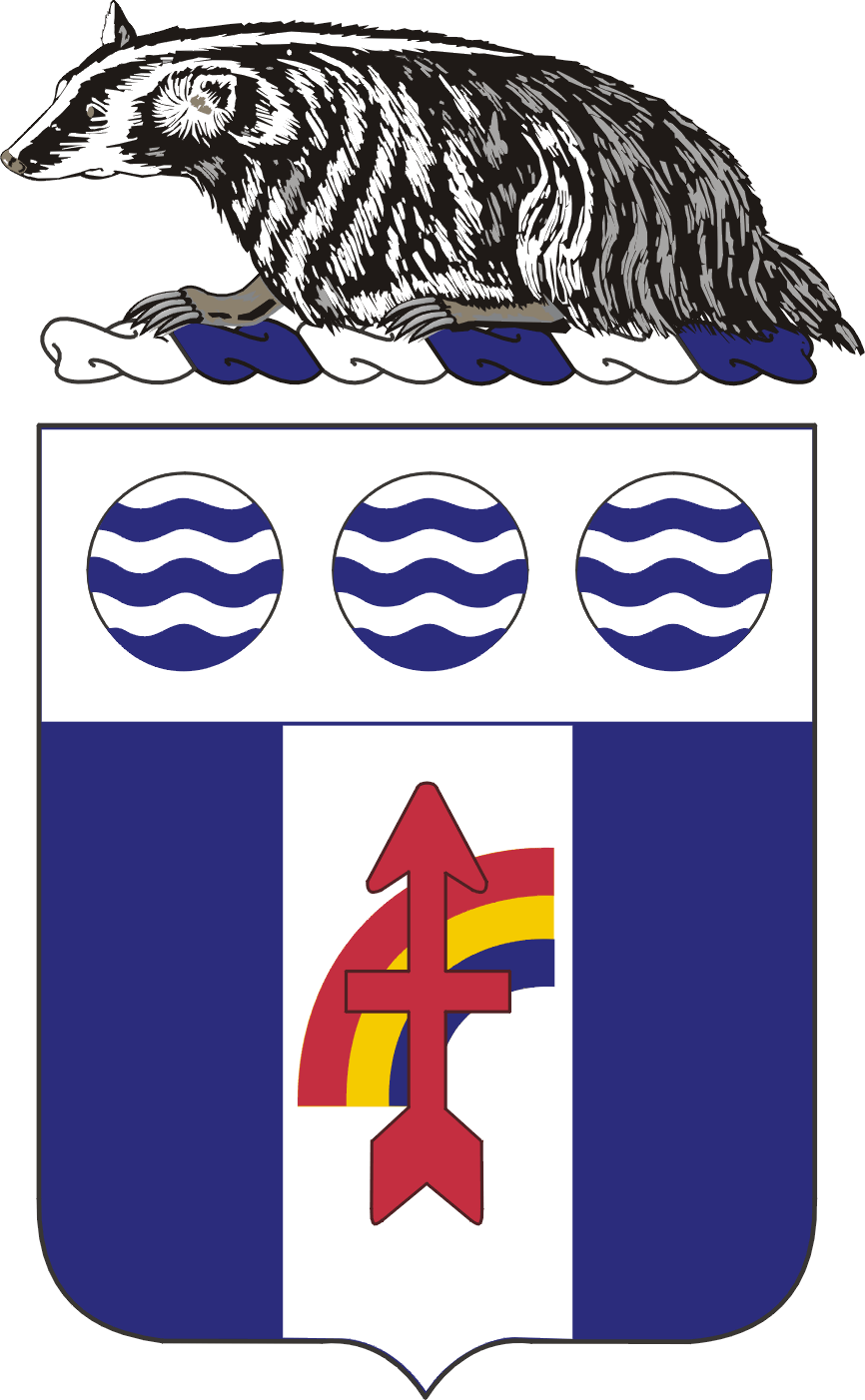
127th Infantry
"Les Terribles"

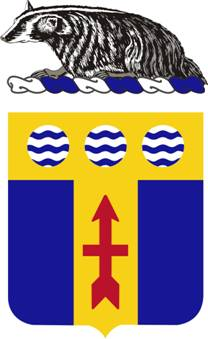
128th Infantry
"Les Terribles" (The Terrible Ones)

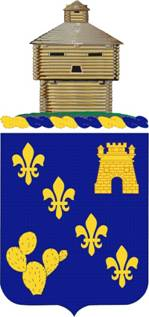
129th Infantry
"Pro Maiore Securitate"

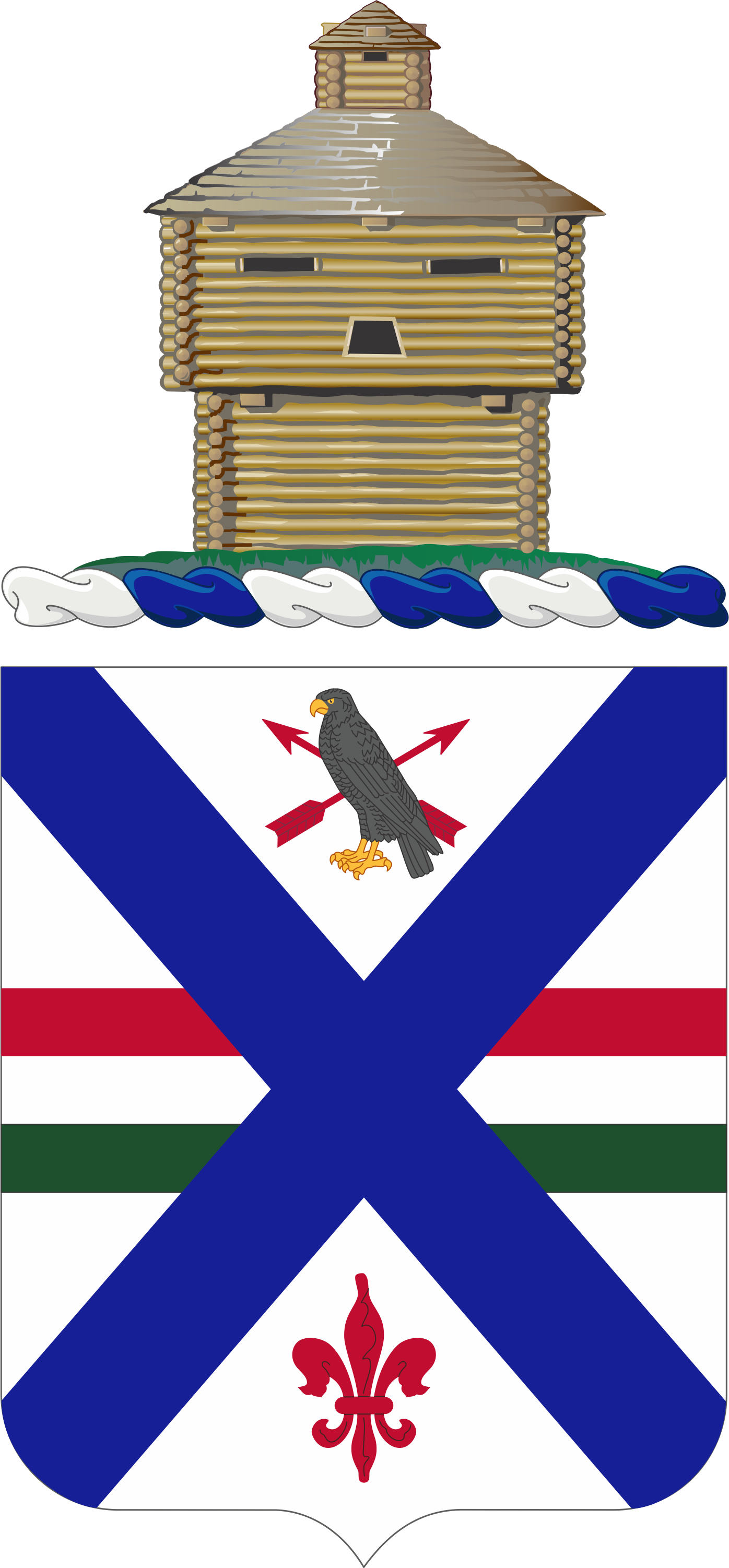
130th Infantry
"Always Ready"

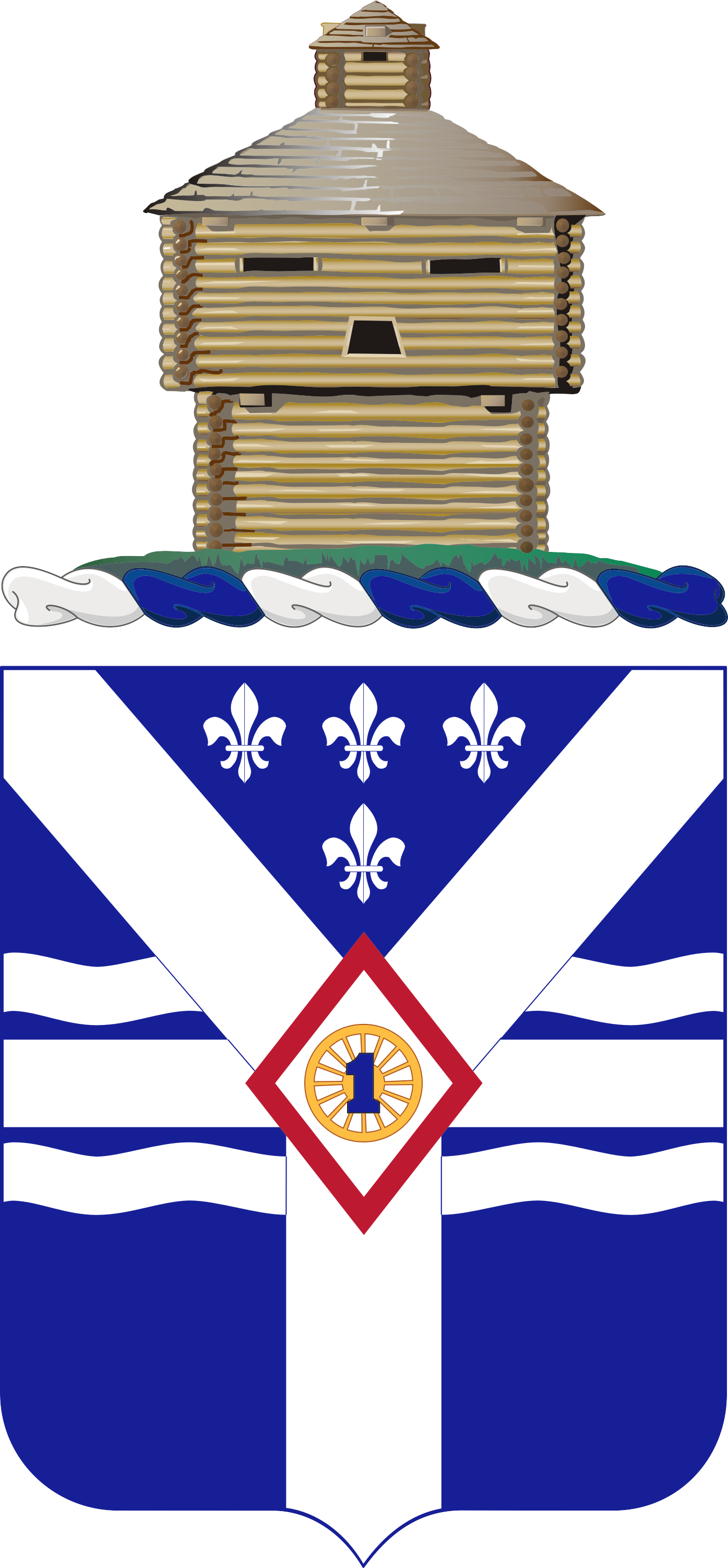
131st Infantry
"Ducit Amor Patriae" (Led by Love of Country)

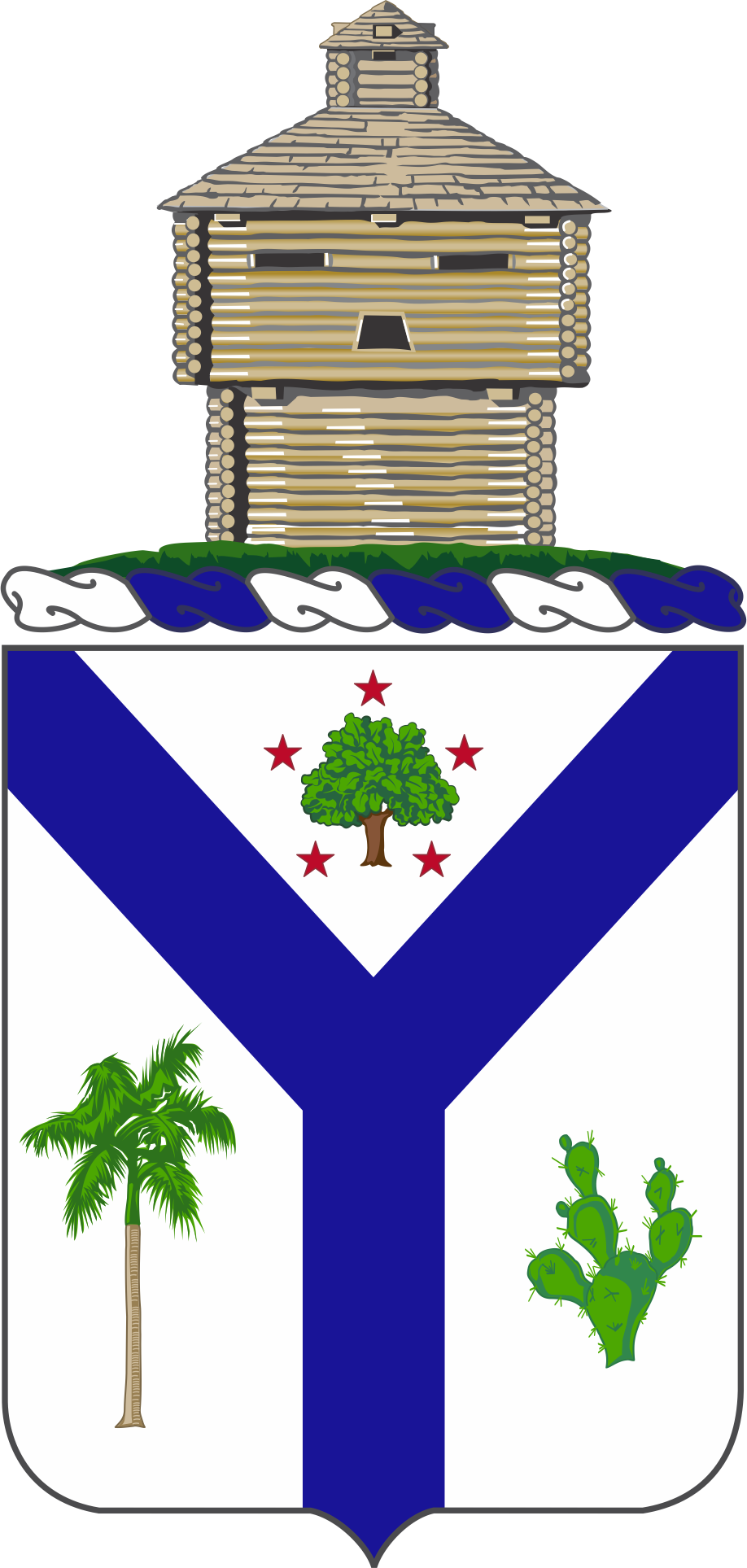
132nd Infantry
"Semper Paratus" (Ever Ready)

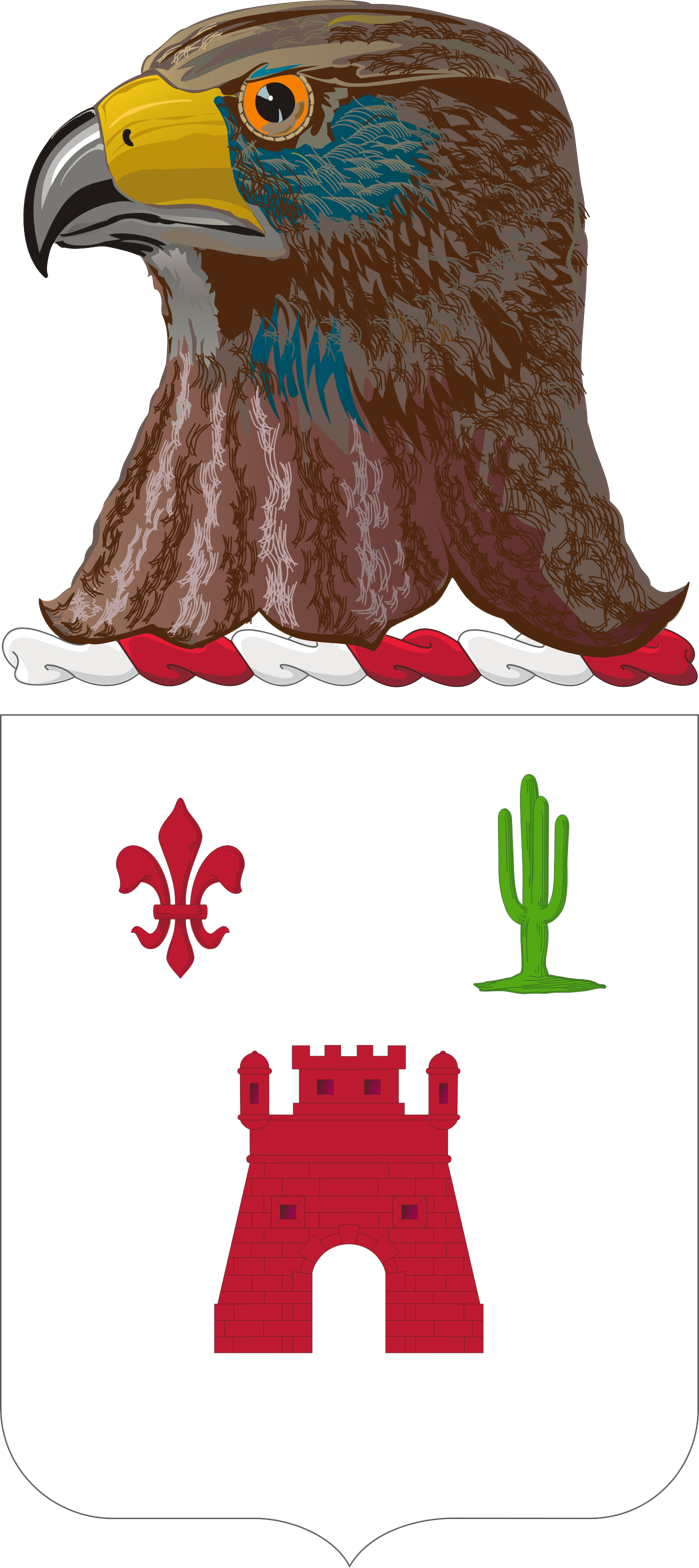
133rd Infantry
"Avauncez" ("Advance" or "Forward")

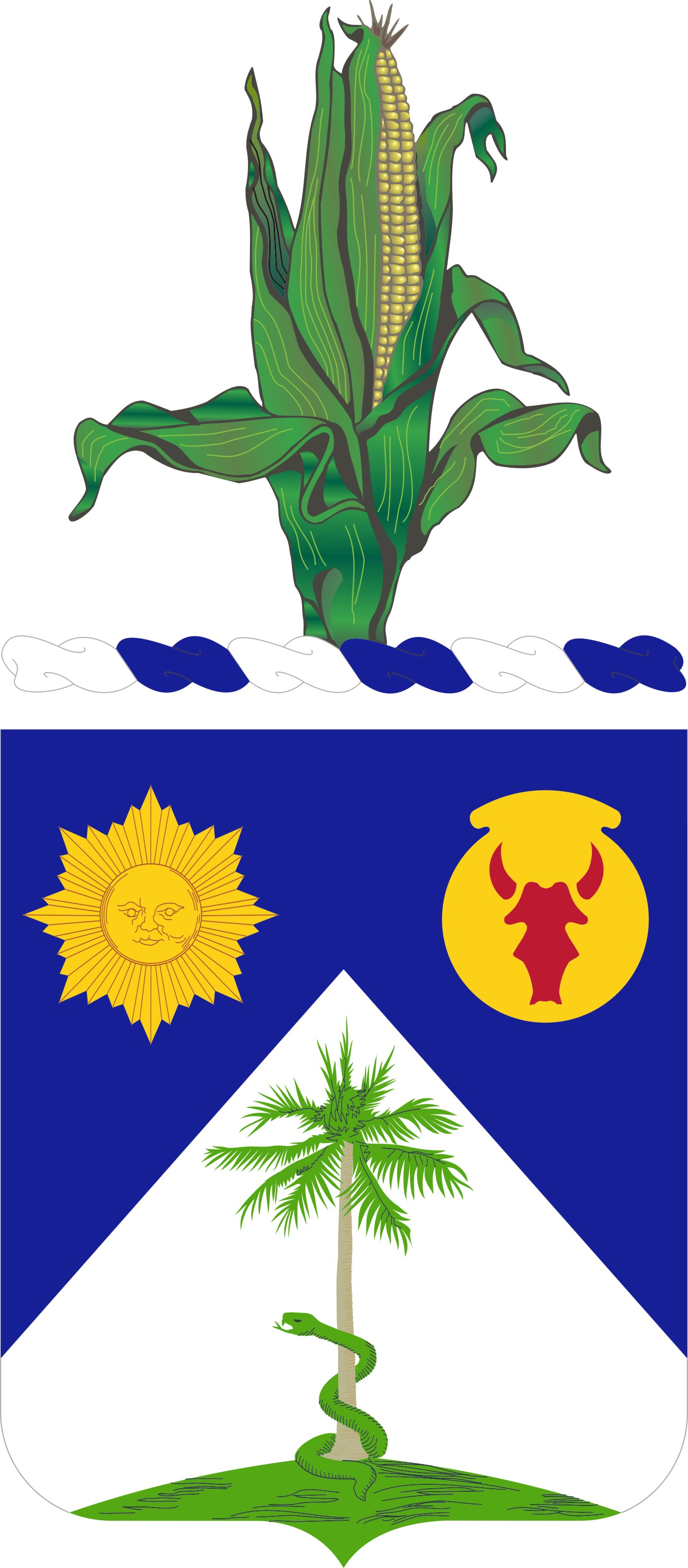
134th Infantry
(now 134th Cavalry)
"Lah We Lah His" (The Strong, The Brave)

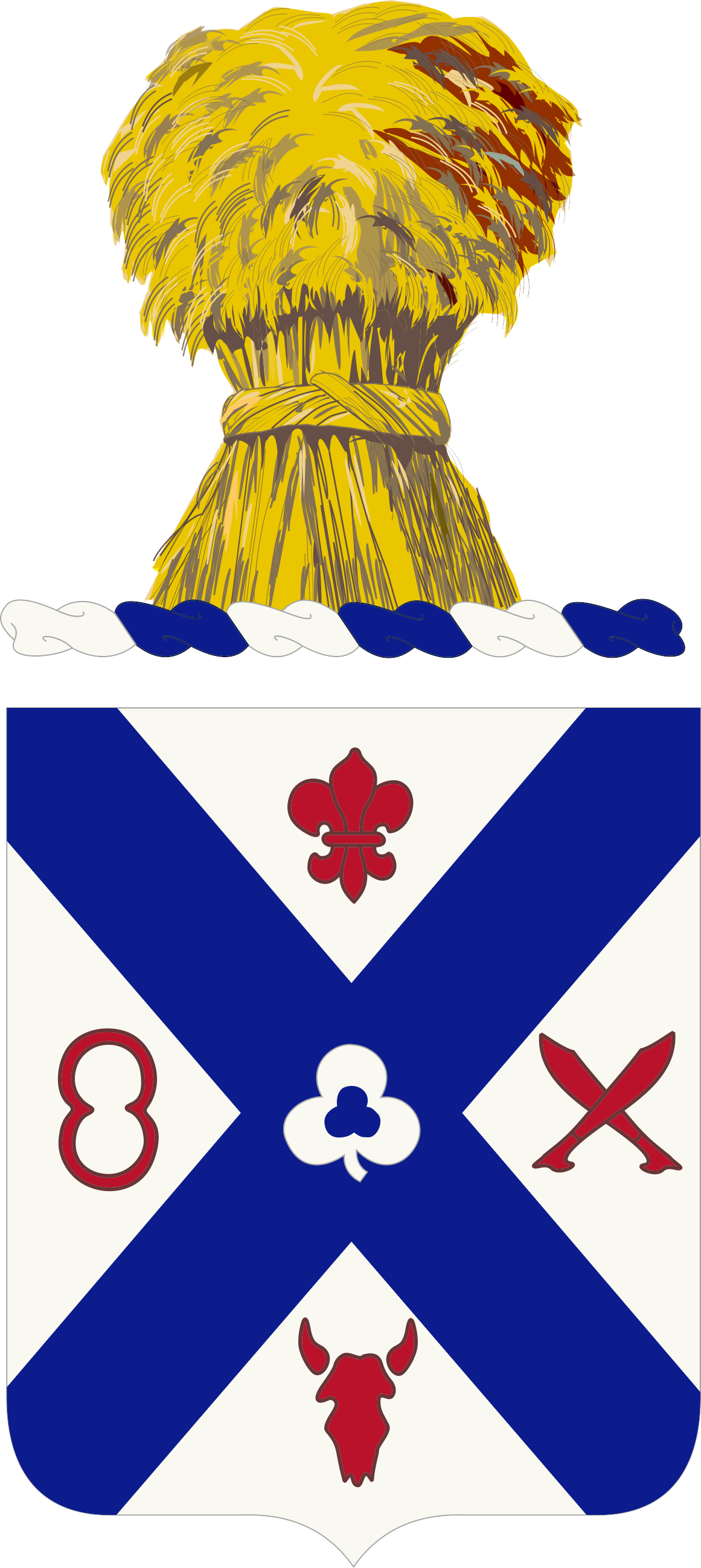
135th Infantry
"To the Last Man"

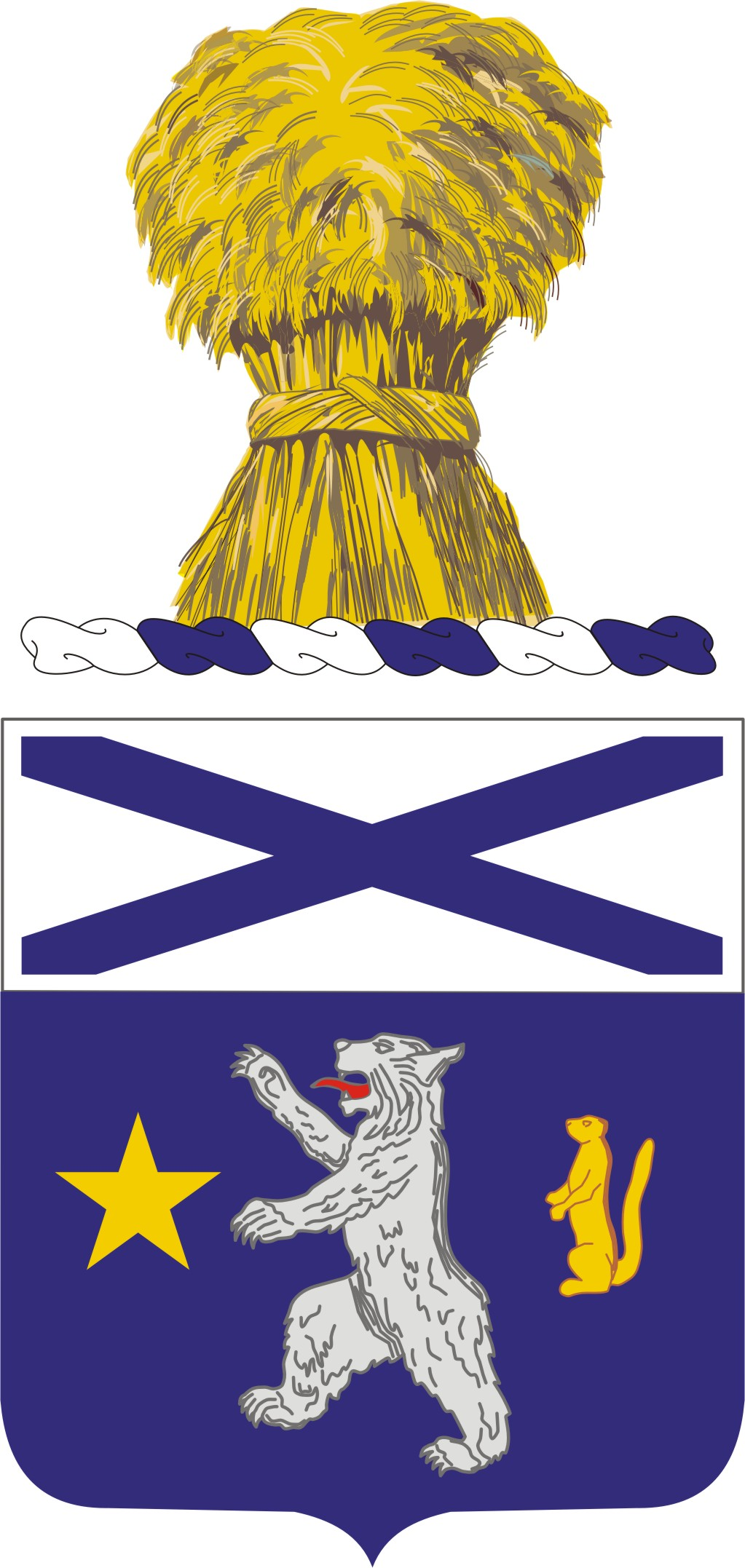
136th Infantry
"Rex Montis" (King of the Hill)

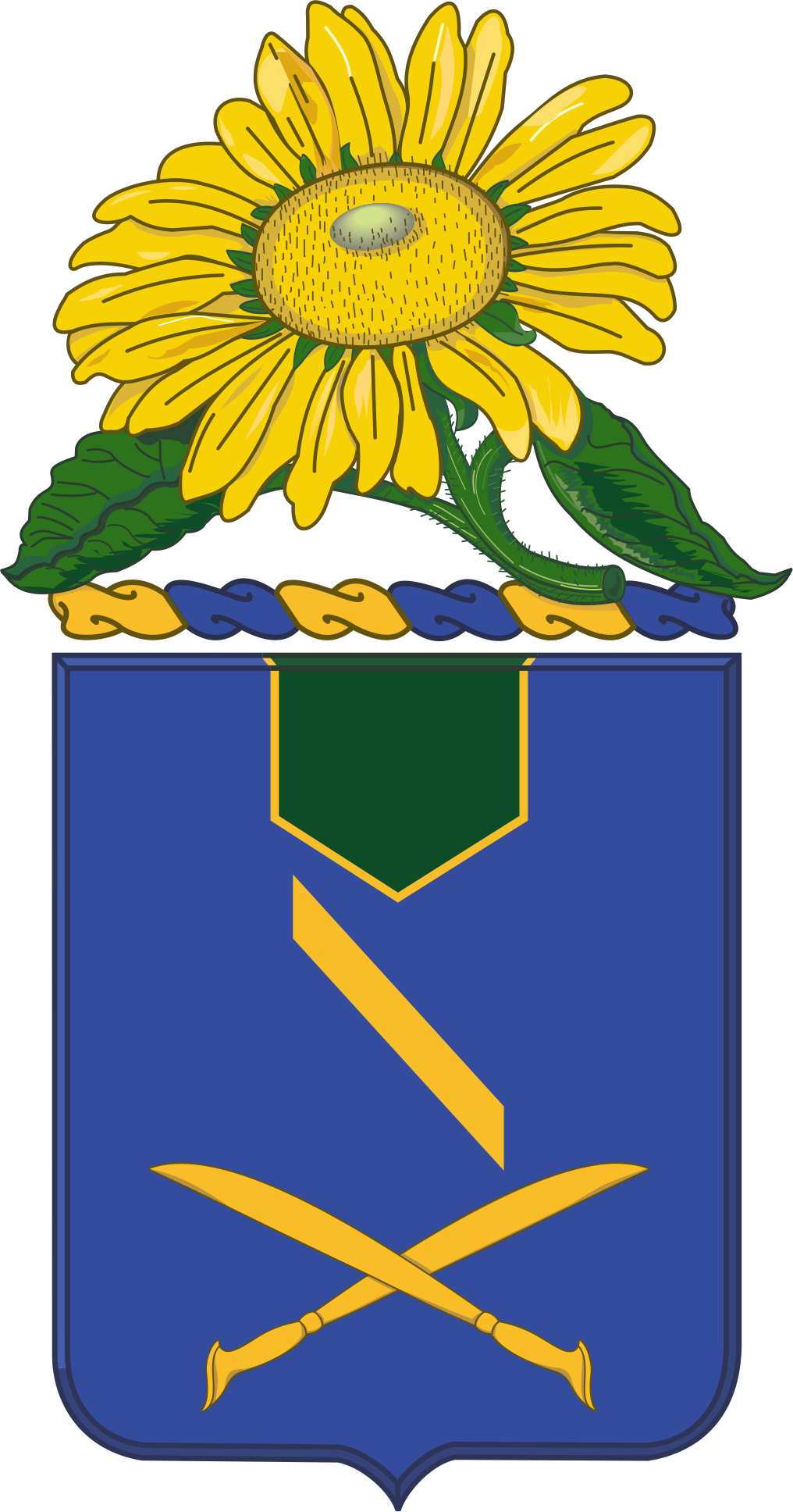
137th Infantry
"Valor for Service"

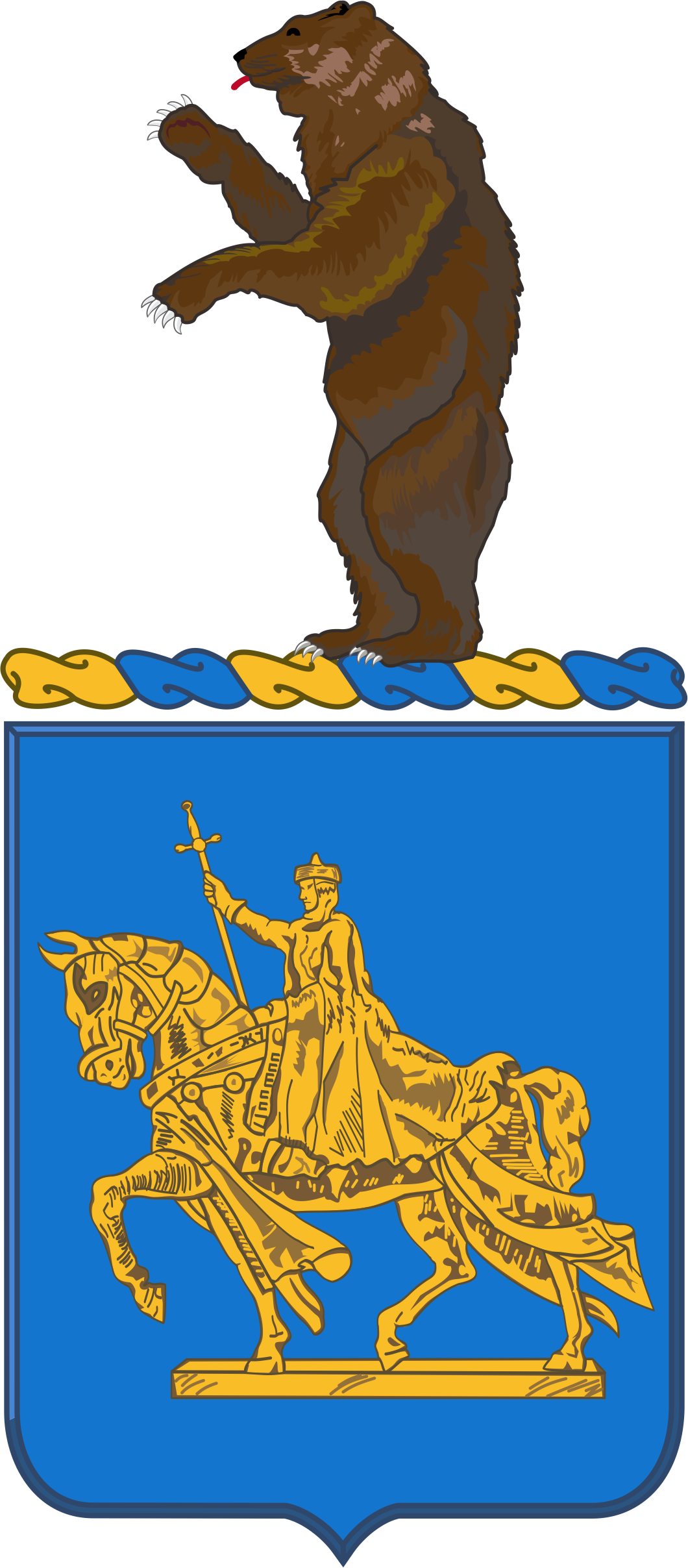
138th Infantry
"St. Louis' Own"

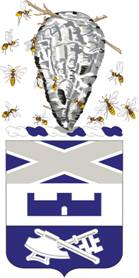
139th Infantry
"First, Furthest, Last"

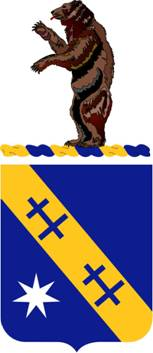
140th Infantry
"Siempre Listo" (Ever Ready)

141st Infantry
"Remember the Alamo"

142nd Infantry
"I'll Face You"

143rd Infantry
"Arms Secure Peace"

144th Infantry
"Par Oneri" (Equal to the Task)

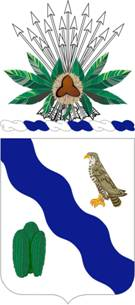
145th Infantry
(now 145th Armored)
"Excel"

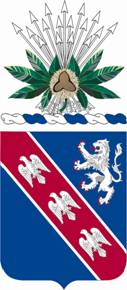
147th Infantry
(formerly 147th Armor)
"Cargoneek Guyoxim" (Always Ready)

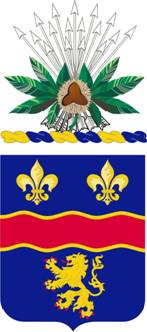
148th Infantry
"We'll Do It"

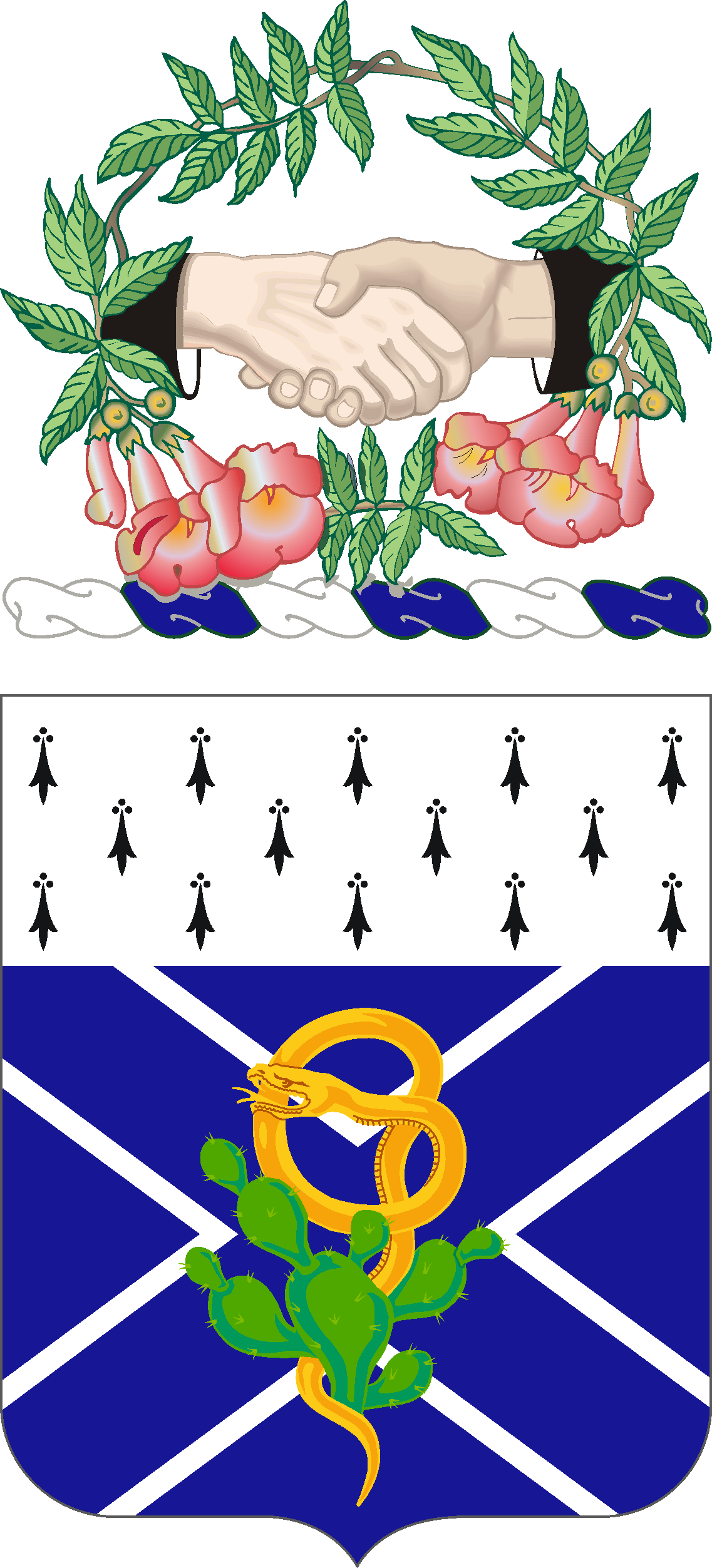
149th Infantry
(now 123rd Armor)
"Esto Perpetua" (May It Live Forever)

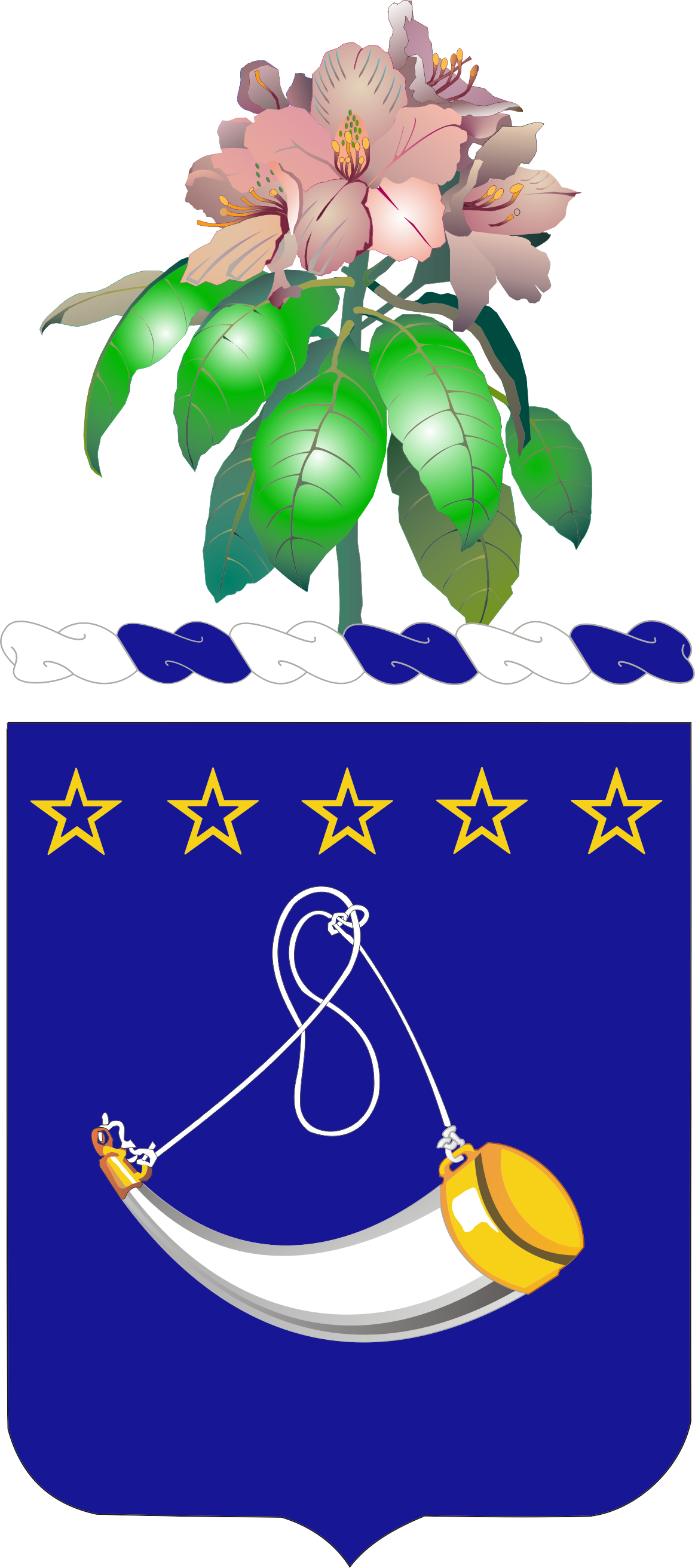
150th Infantry
(now 150th Armor)
"We Can Take It

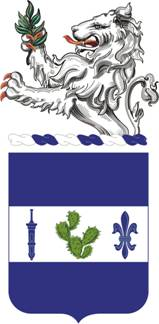
151st Infantry
"Wide Awake-Wide Awake"

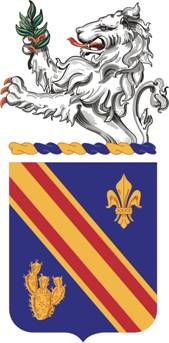
152nd Infantry
(now 152nd Cavalry)
"Fit to Fight"

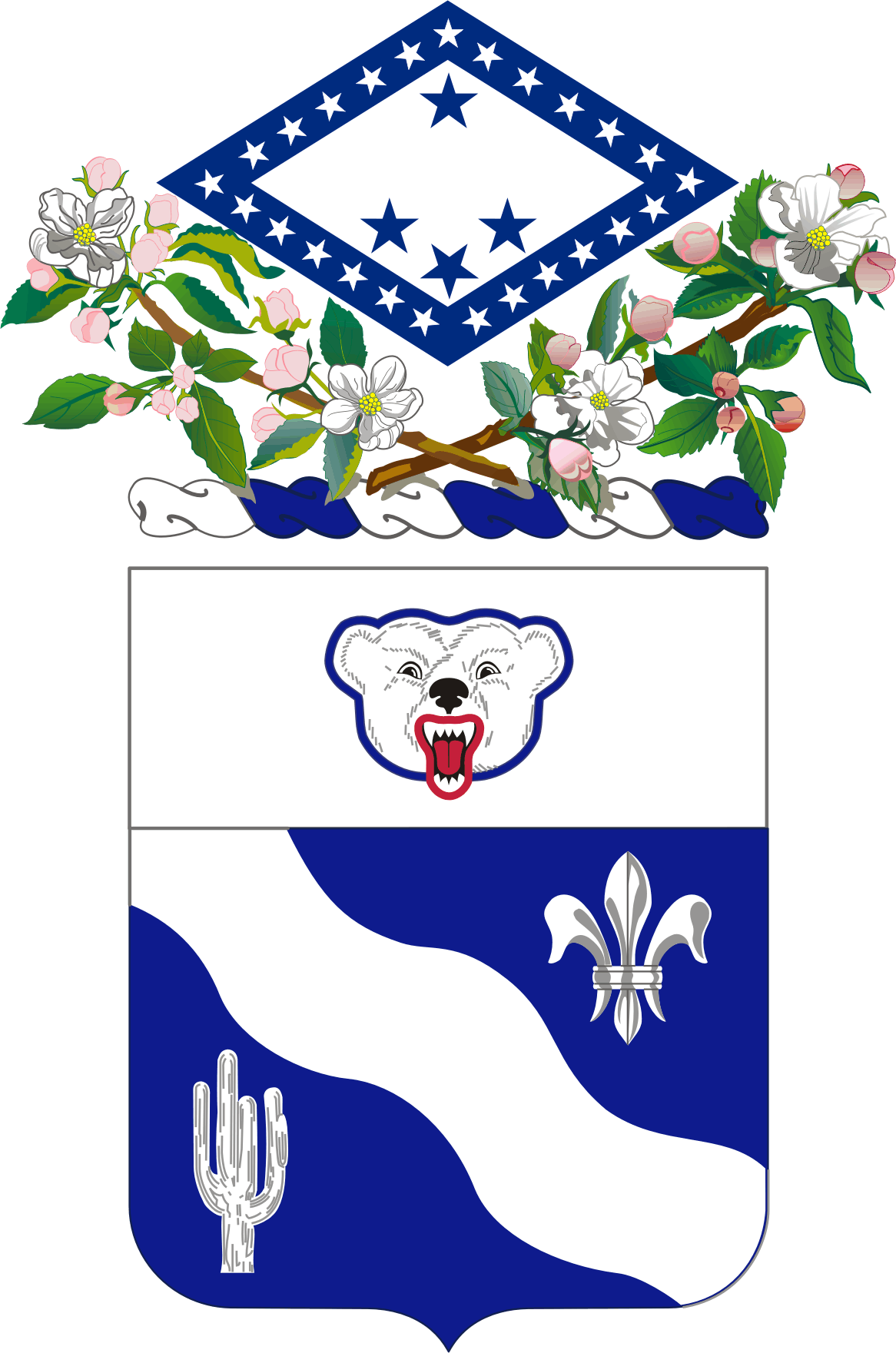
153rd Infantry
"Let's Go"

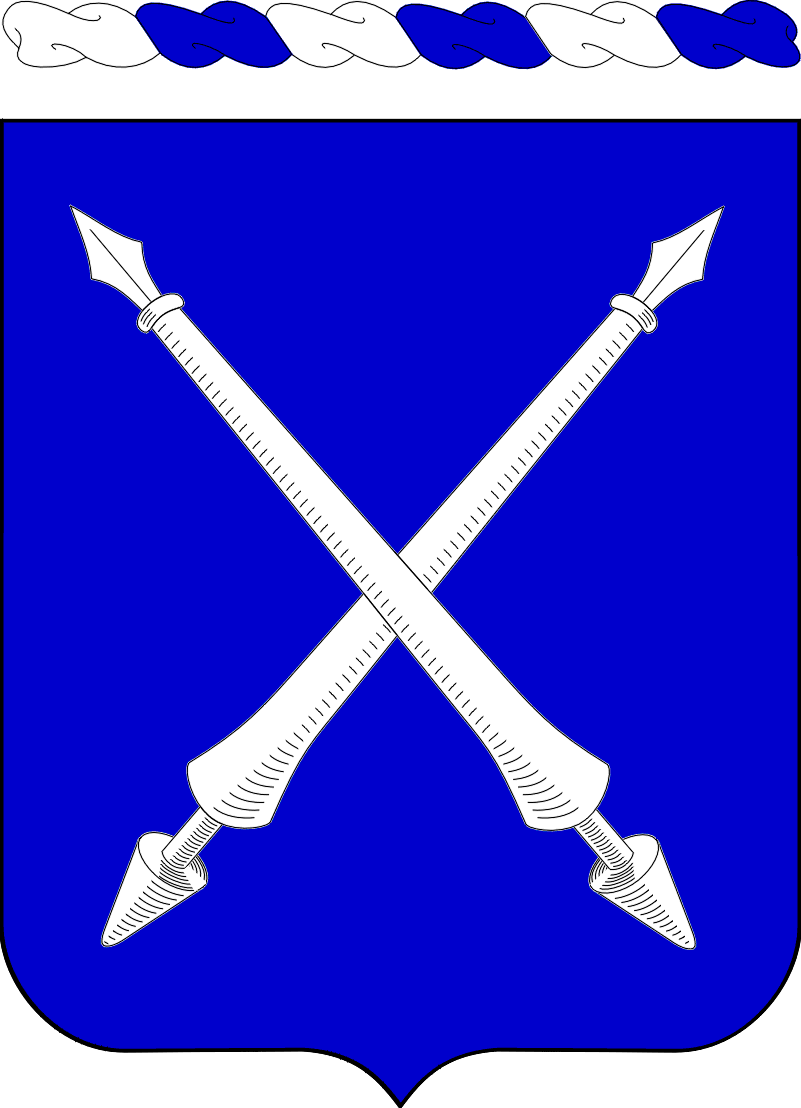
154th Infantry
(now 154th Regiment)
"Firm To My Trust"

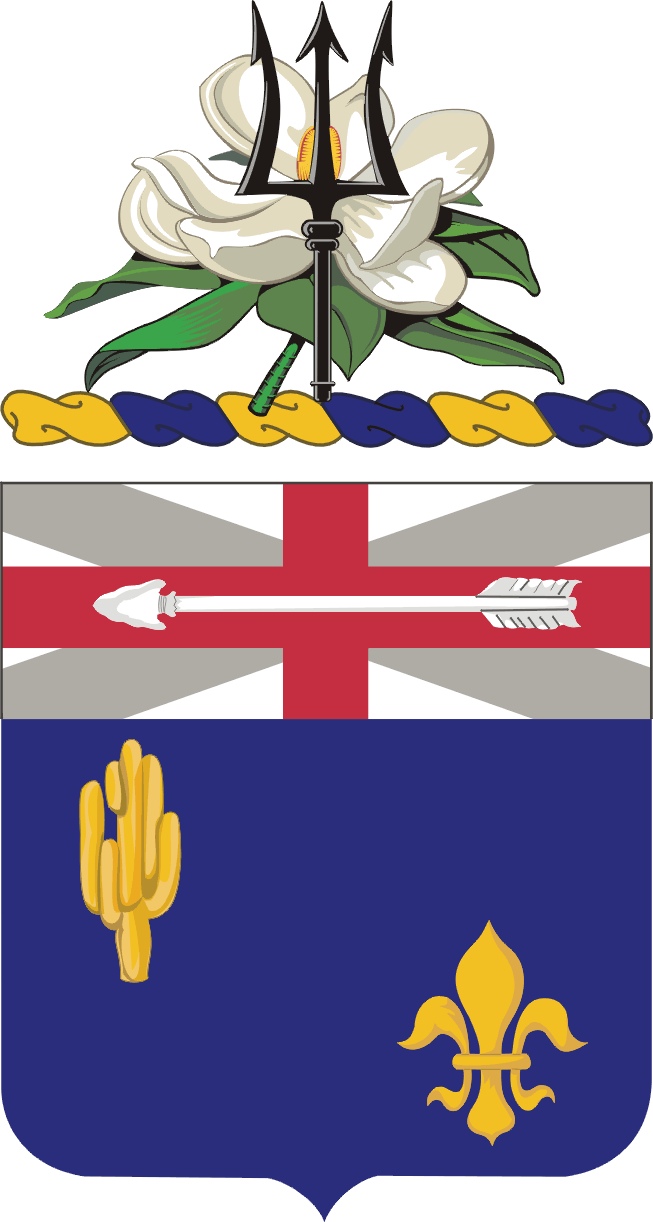
155th Infantry
"Stand Fast"
"Mississippi Rifles"

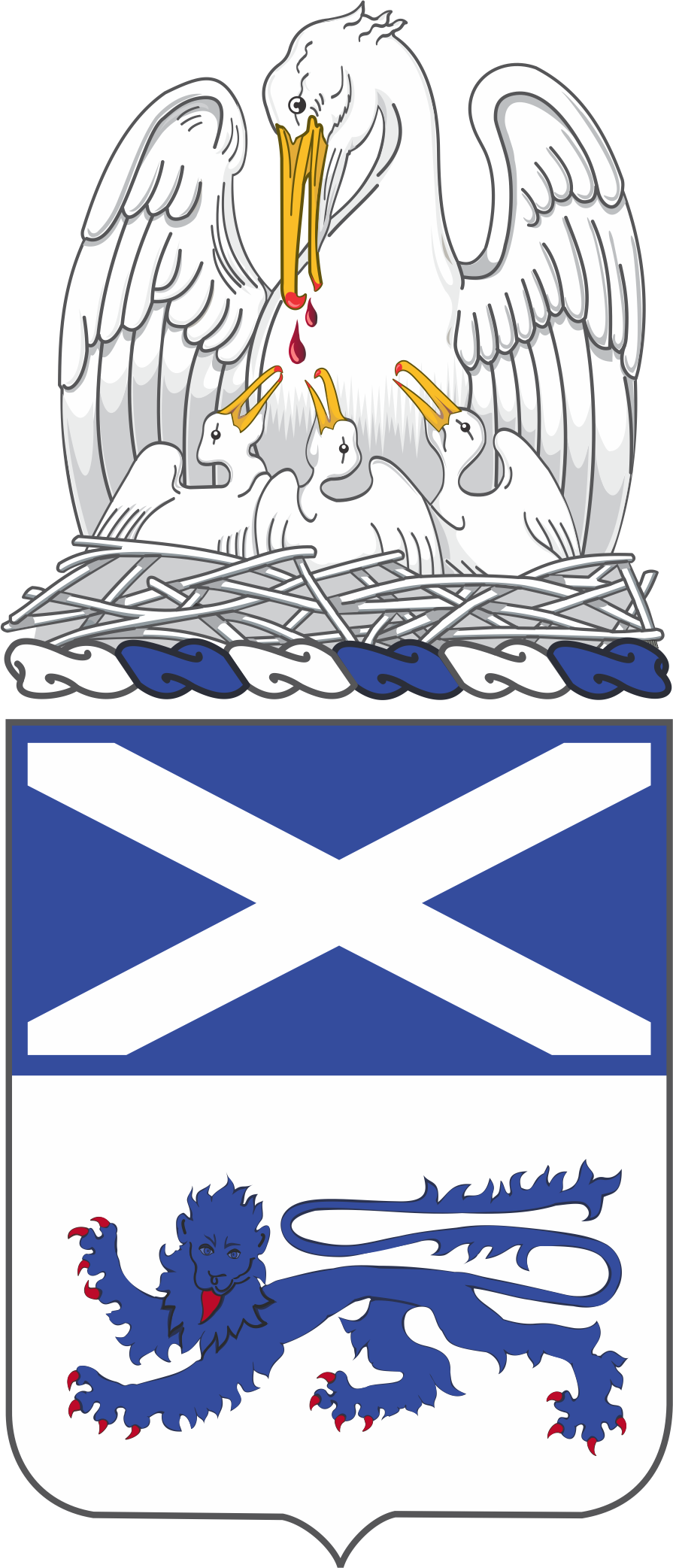
156th Infantry
"Dieu Et Moi" (God and Me)

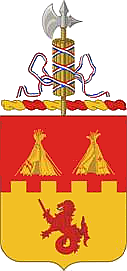
157th Infantry
(now 157th Field Artillery)
"Eager For Duty"

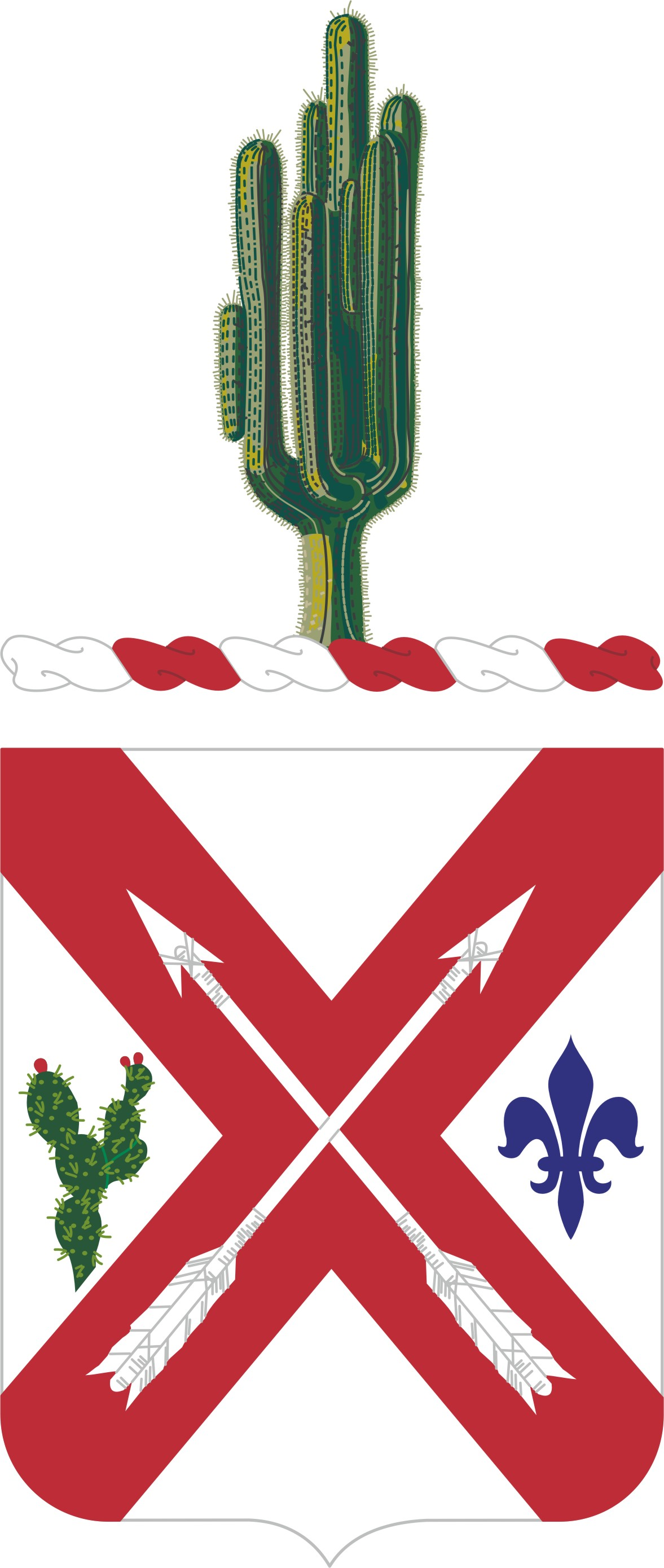
158th Infantry
"Cuidado" (Take Care)

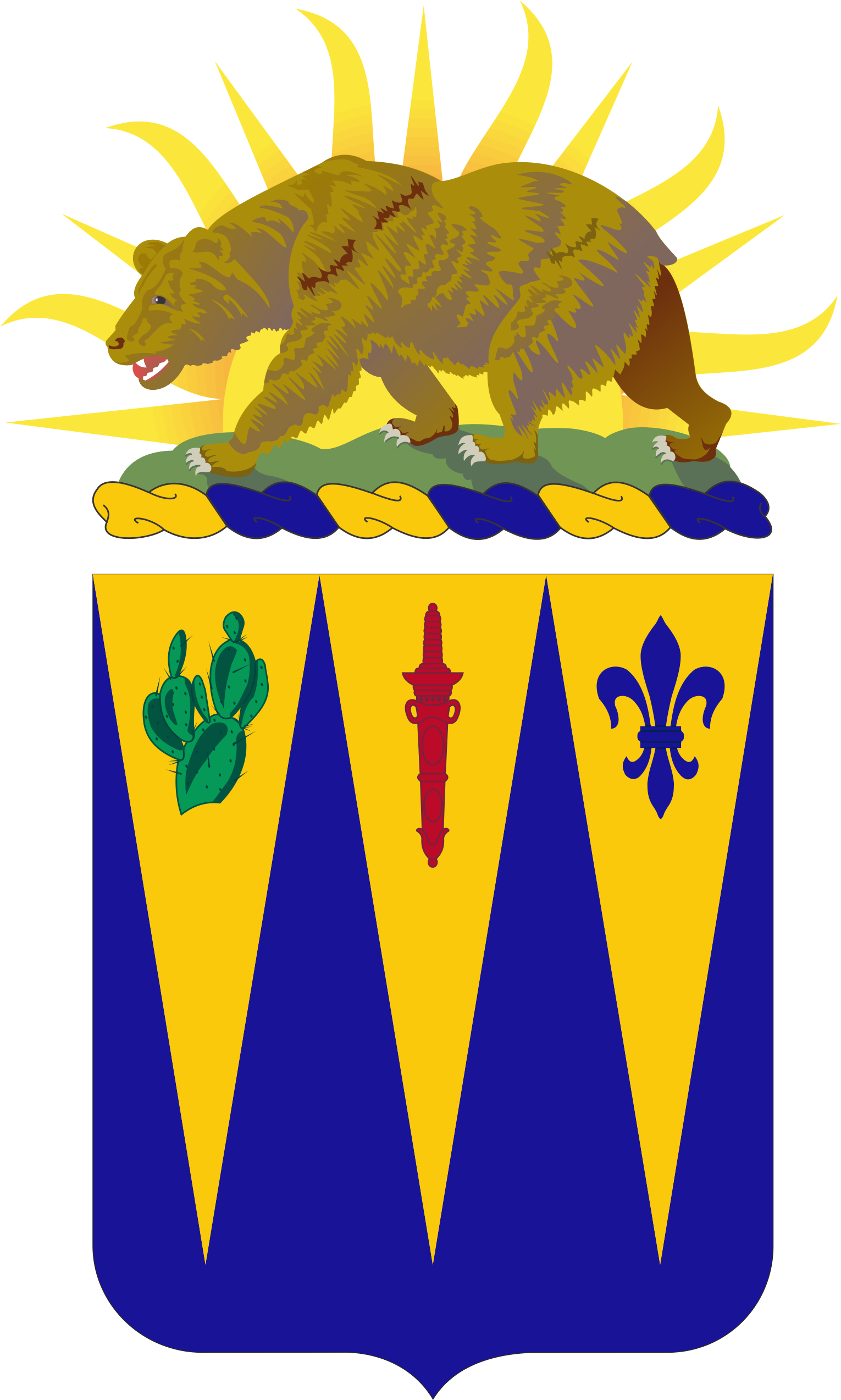
159th Infantry
"Unity for Service"

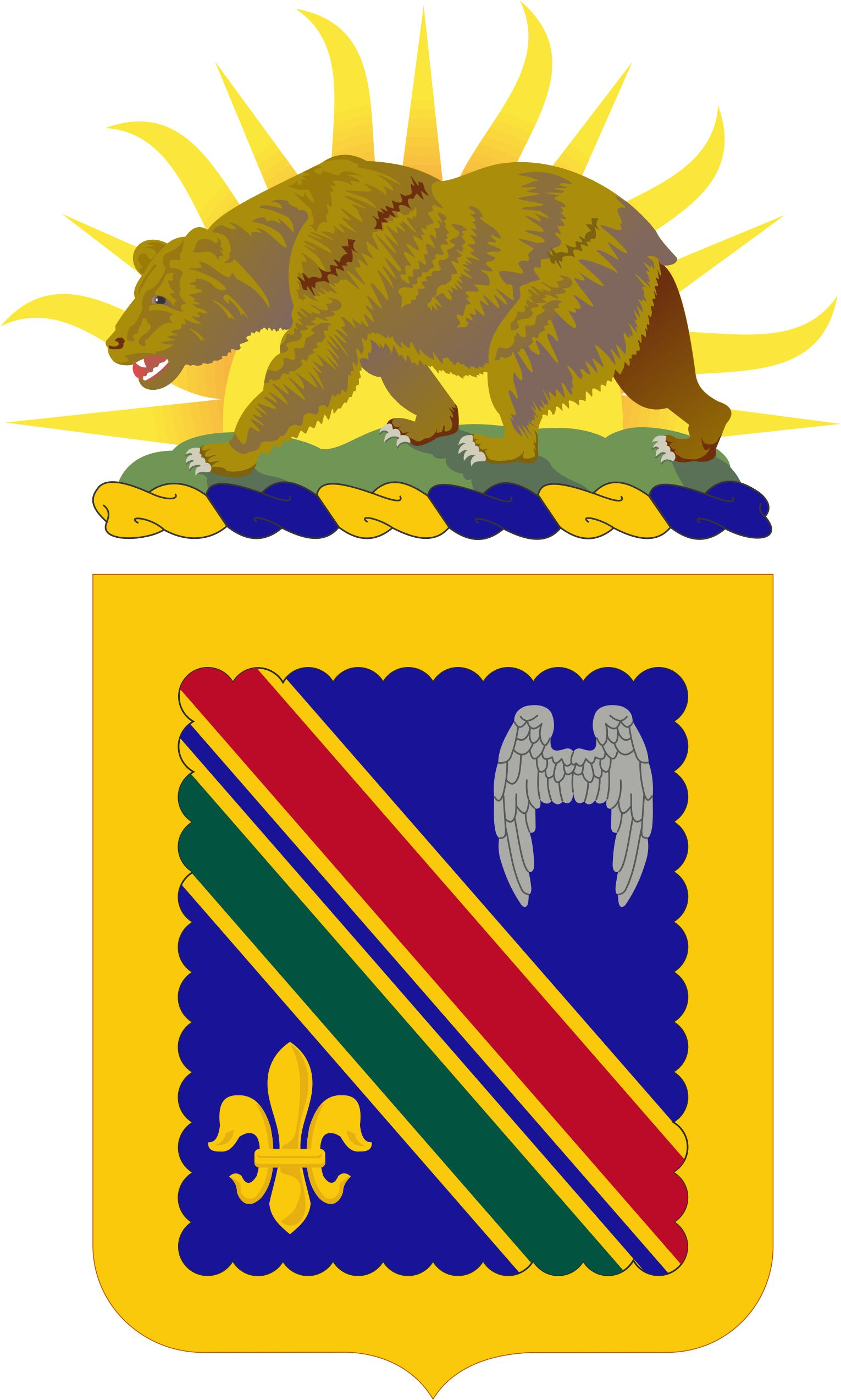
160th Infantry
"Habeant" (Strike)

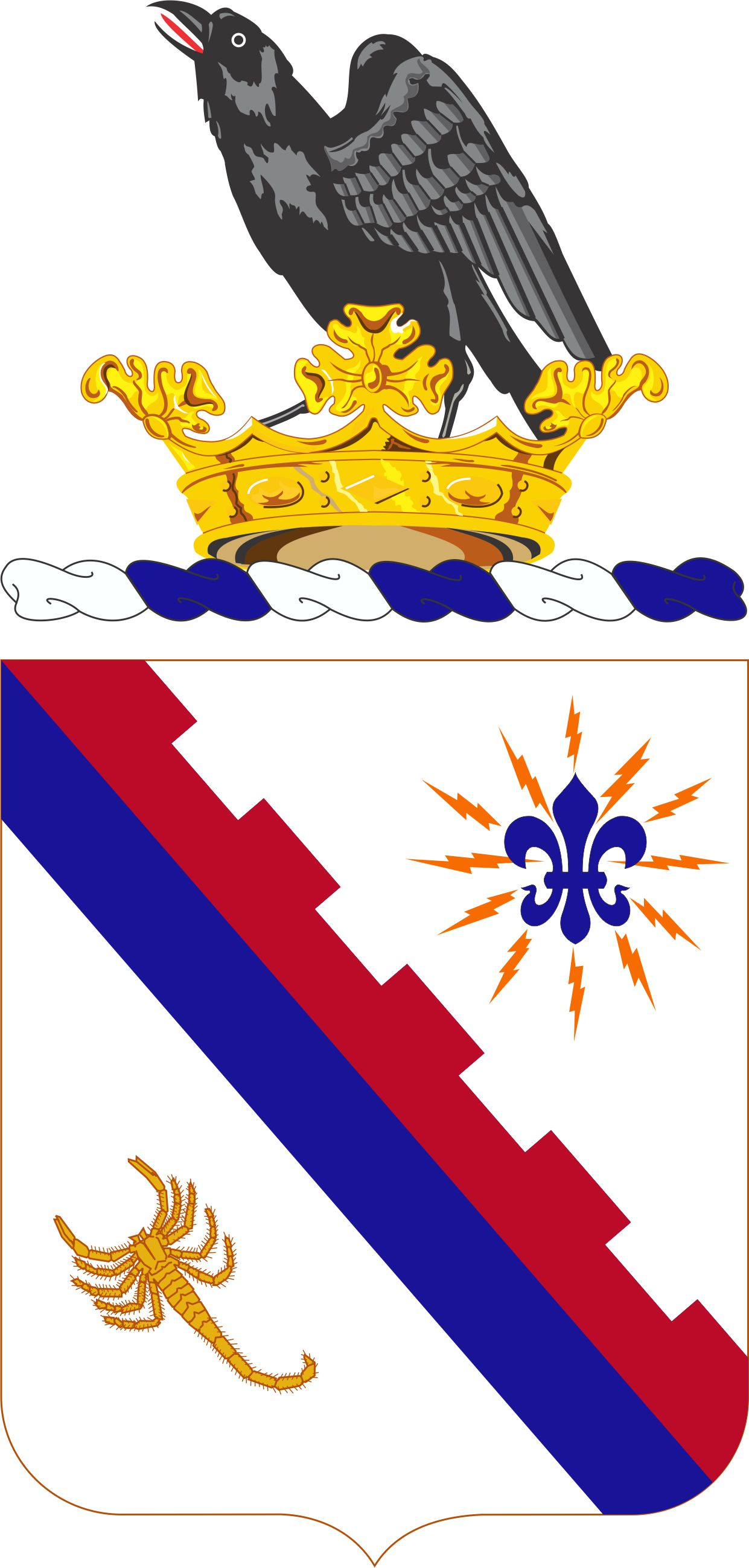
161st Infantry
"First In War - First In Peace"

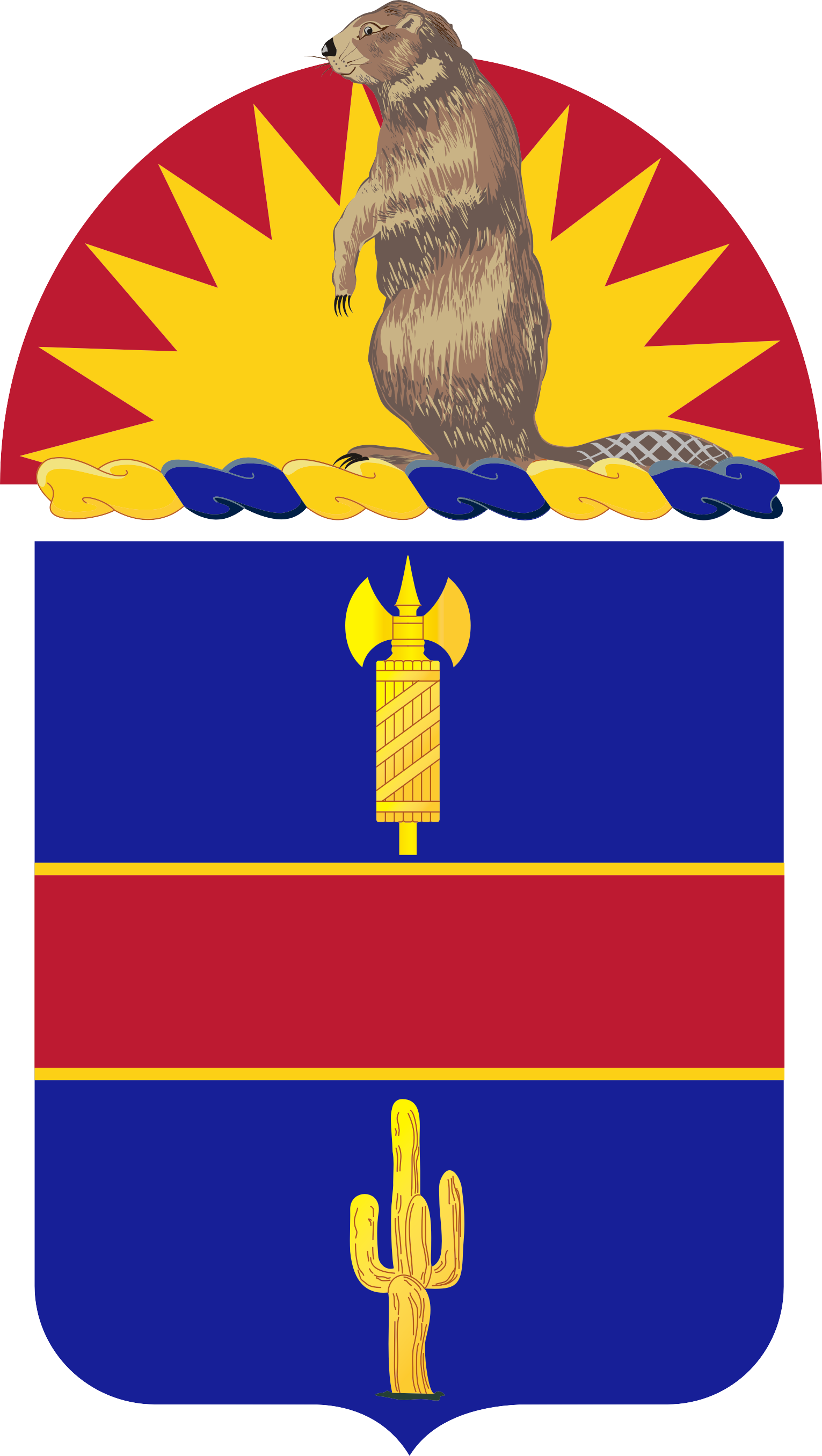
162nd Infantry
"First to Assemble"

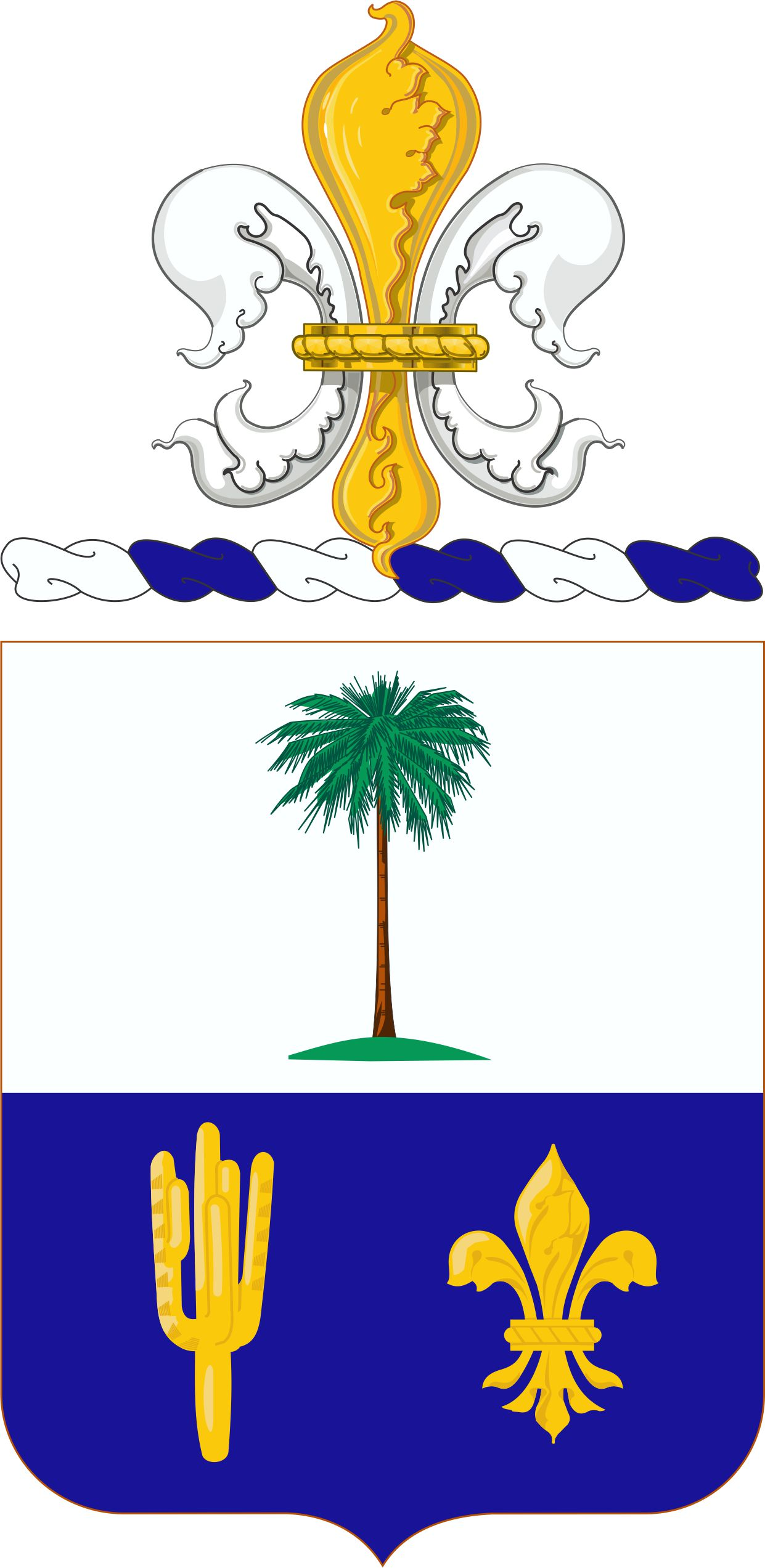
163rd Infantry
"Men, do your duty"

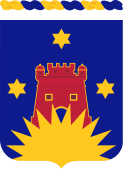
164th Infantry
"Je Suis Pret" (I Am Ready)

165th Infantry
(now 69th Infantry)
"Gentle When Stroked, Fierce When Provoked"

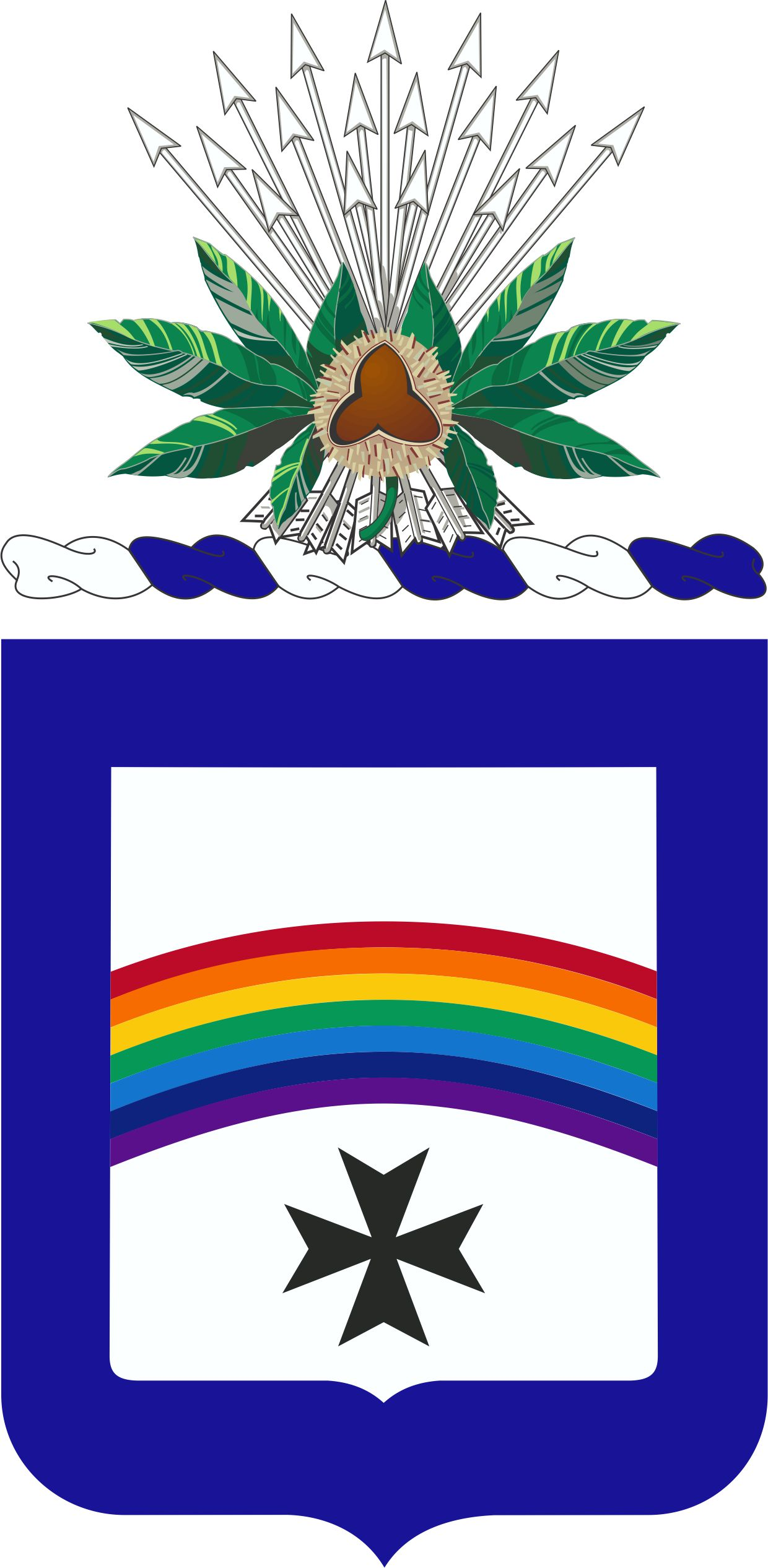
166th Infantry
"Follow me

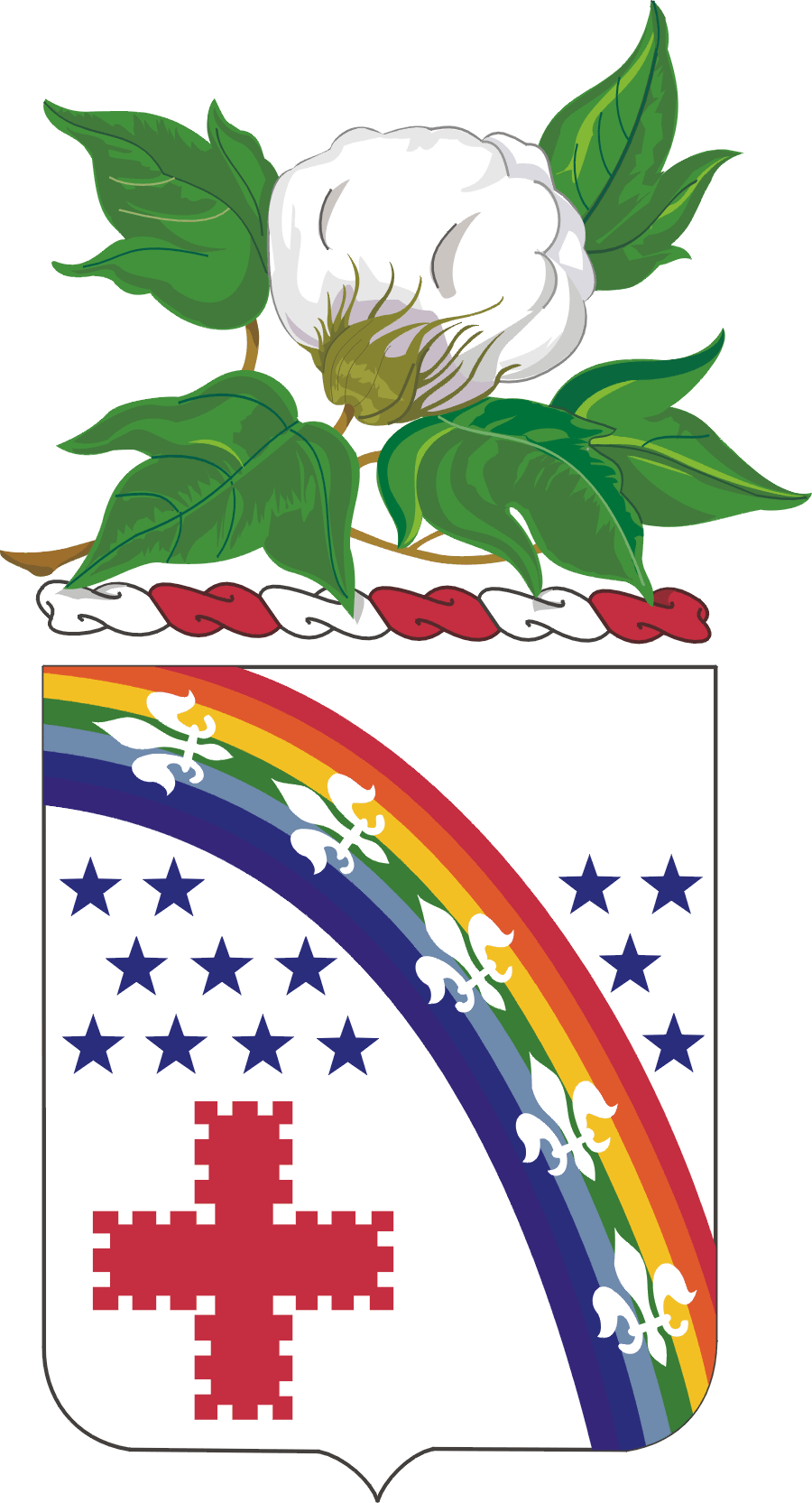
167th Infantry
"Signa Inferemus" (We Shall Drive Forward)
"Fourth Alabama"

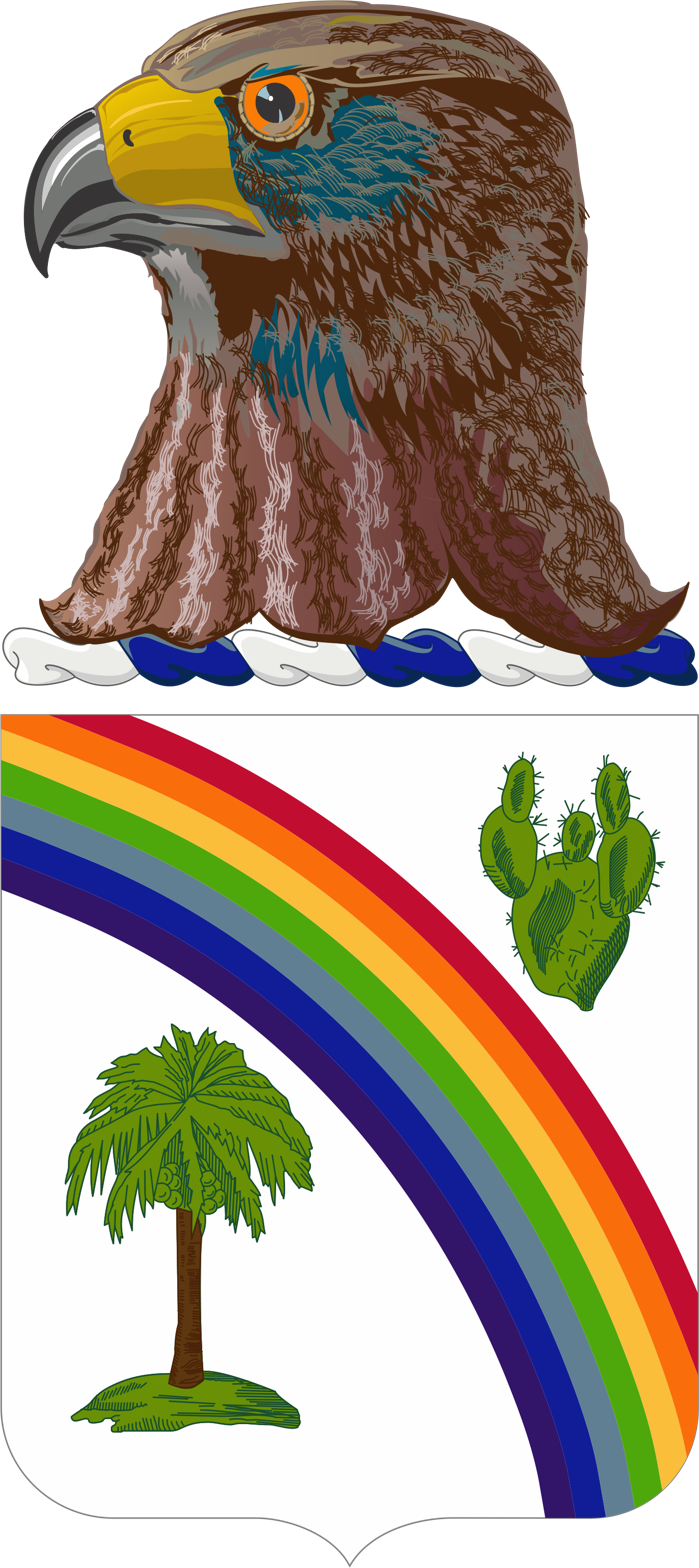
168th Infantry
"On Guard"

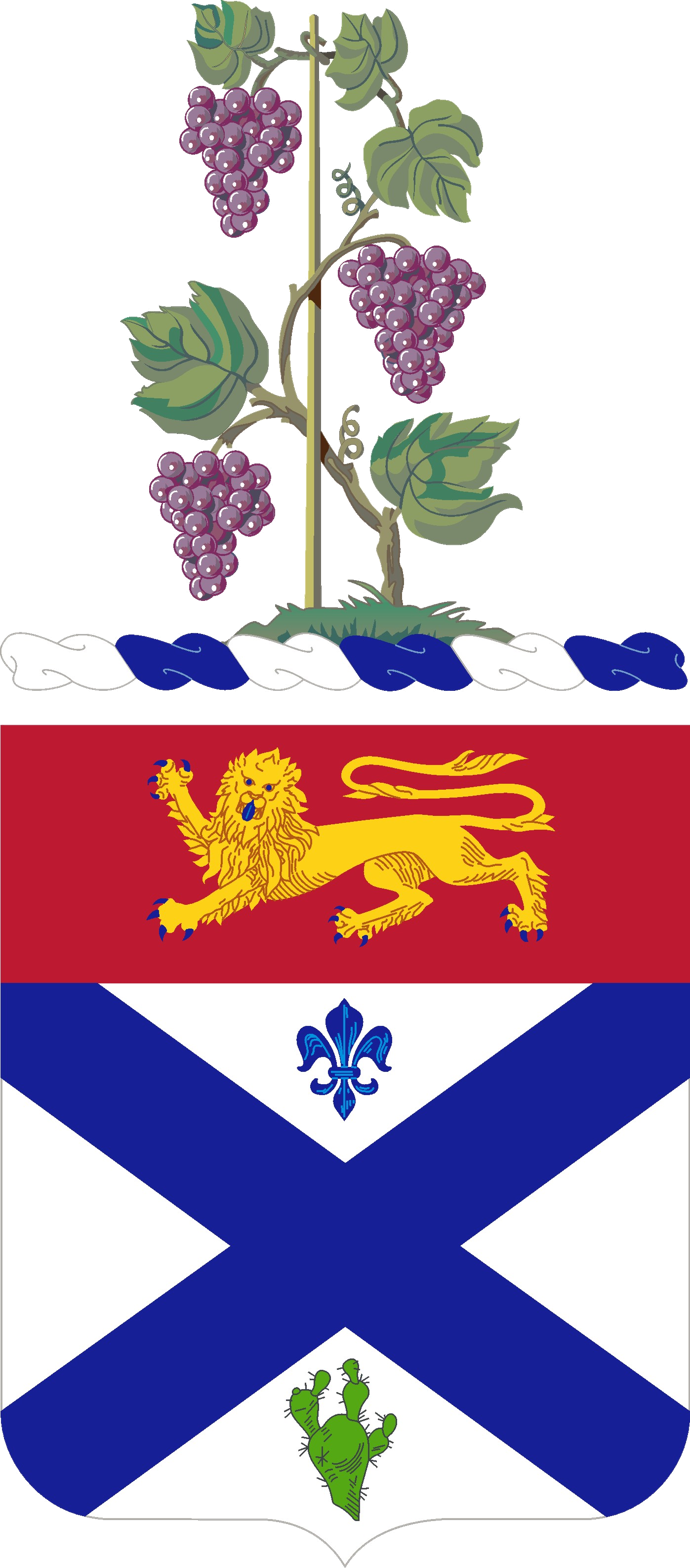
169th Infantry
"Armis Stant Leges" (Laws Are Maintained By Force of Arms)

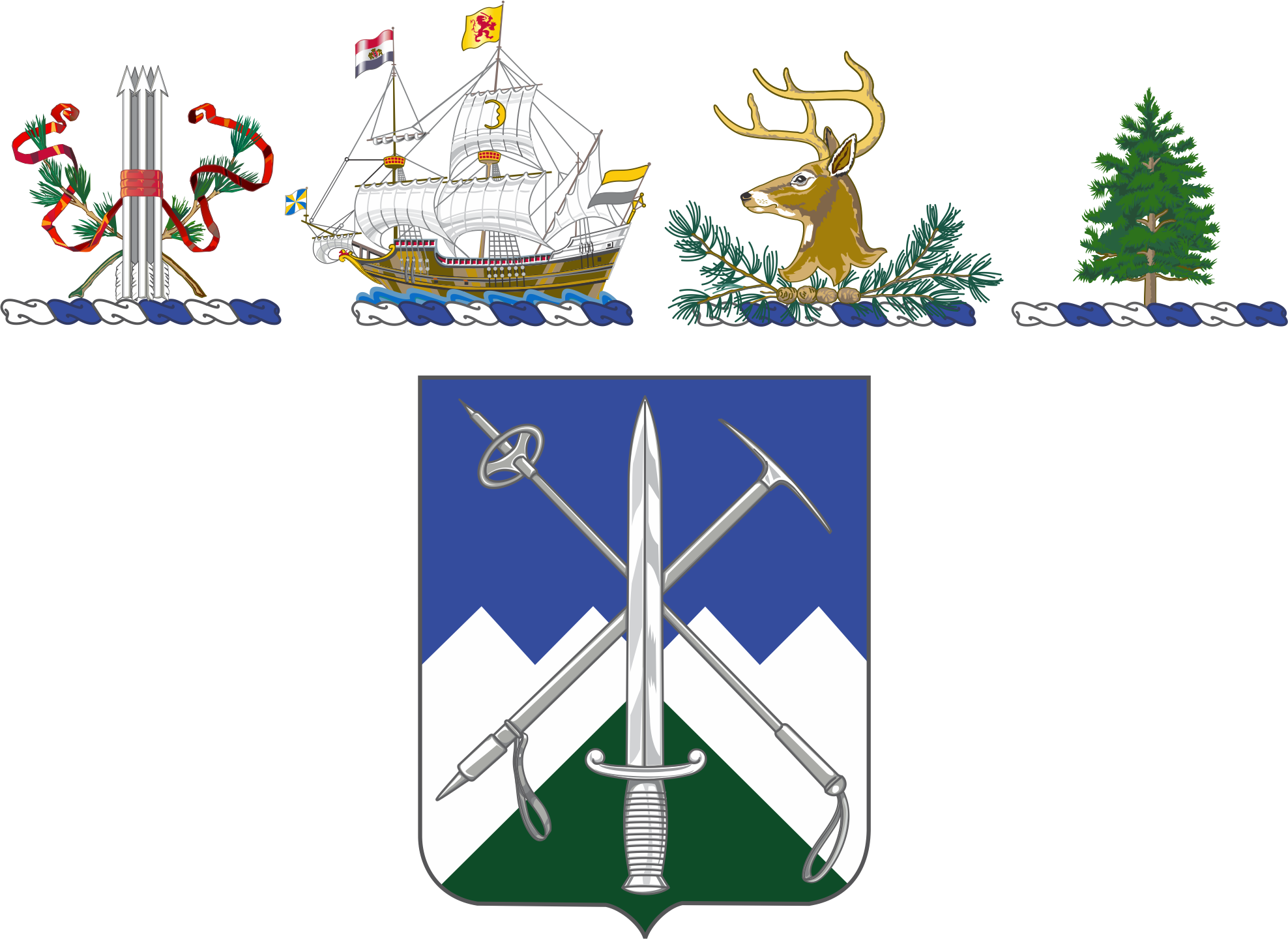
172nd Infantry
"Ascend to victory"
"The Mountain Battalion"

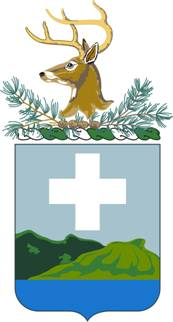
172nd Infantry
(now 172nd Cavalry)
"Put the Vermonters Ahead"

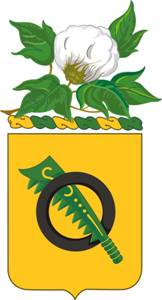
173rd Infantry
(formerly 131st Cavalry and 131st Armor)
"Taught to Lead"

175th Infantry
"Decus Est Praesidium" (An Honour and a Guard)

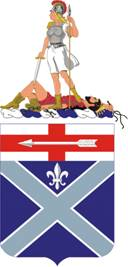
176th Infantry
(now 276th Engineer Battalion)
"Liberty or Death"

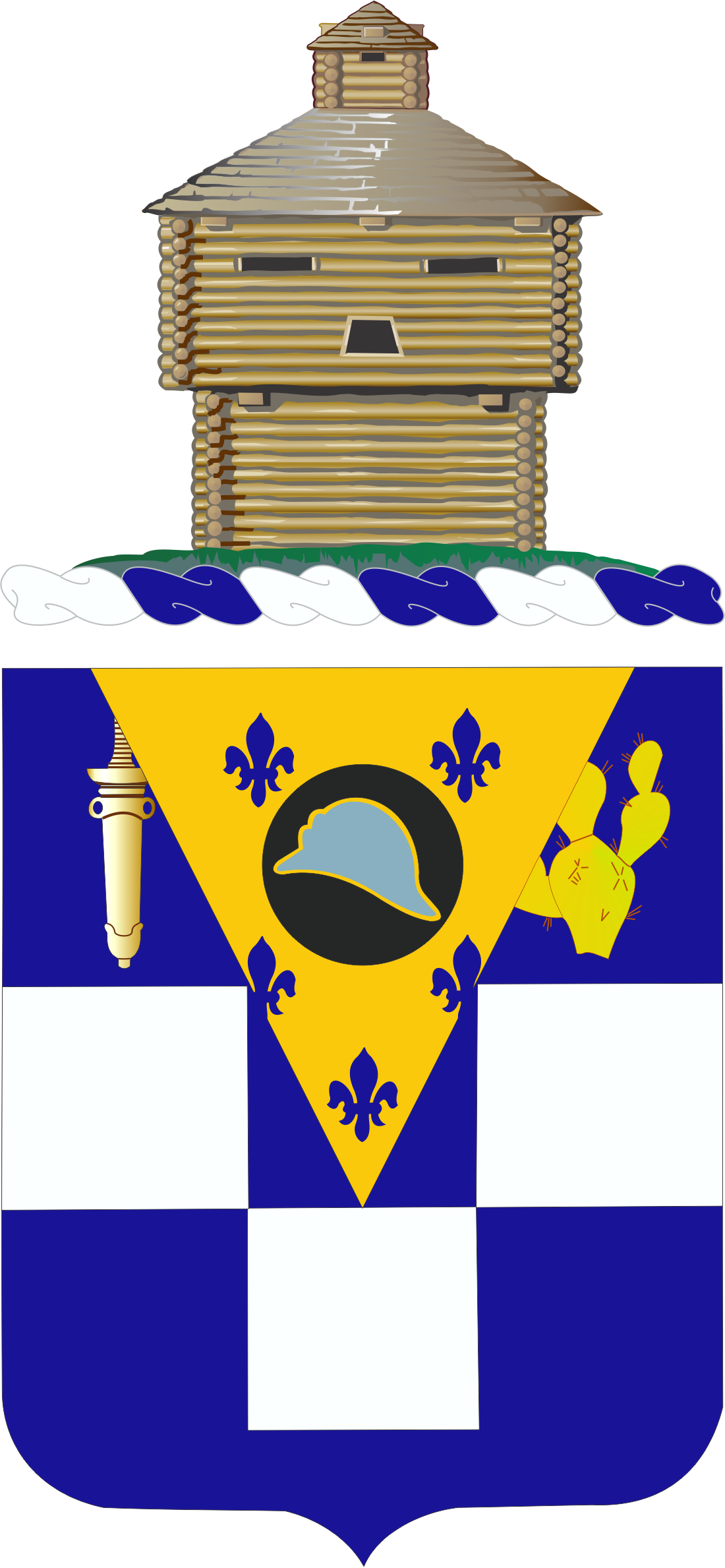
178th Infantry
"One Country One Flag"

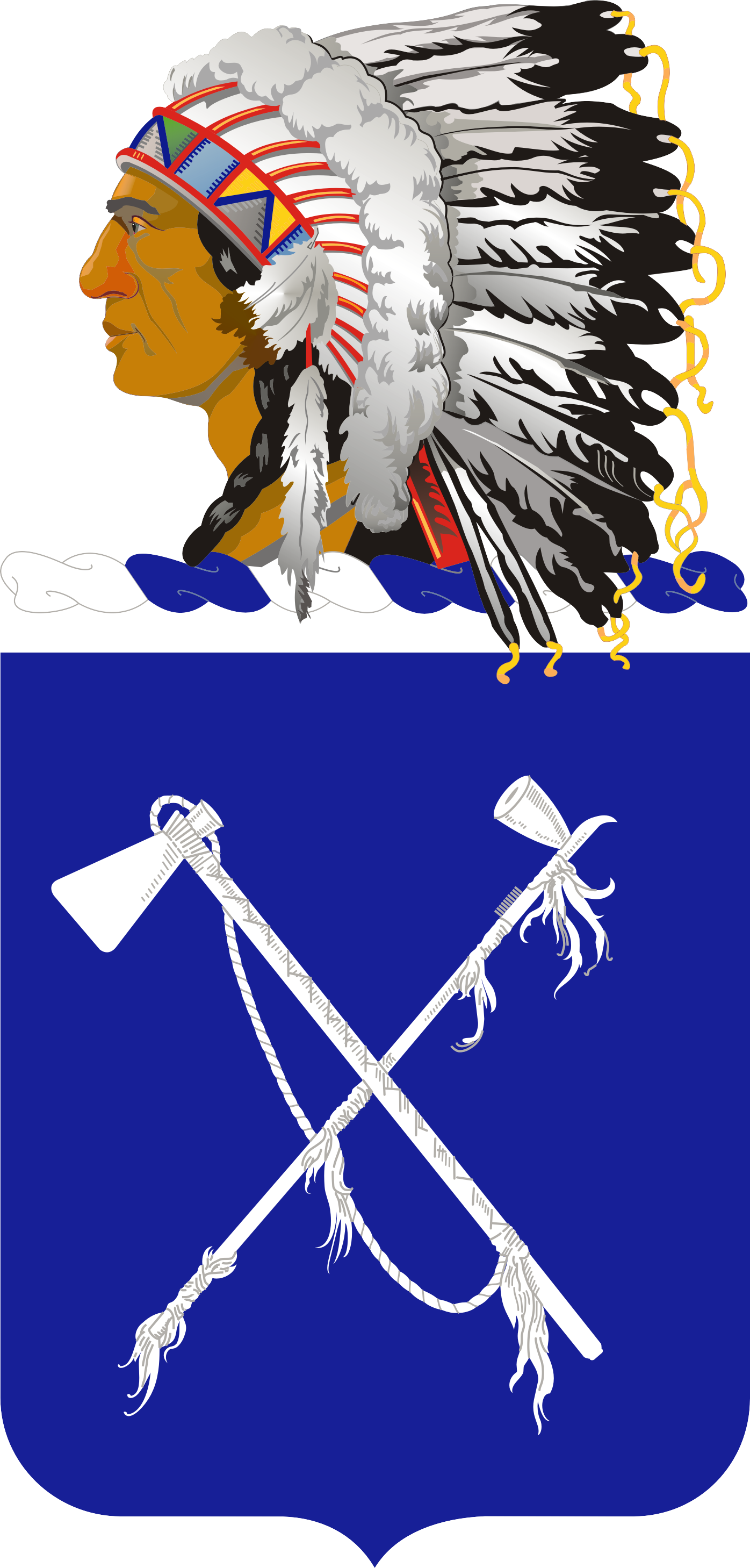
179th Infantry
"In Omina Paratus" (In All Things Prepared)
"Tomahawks"

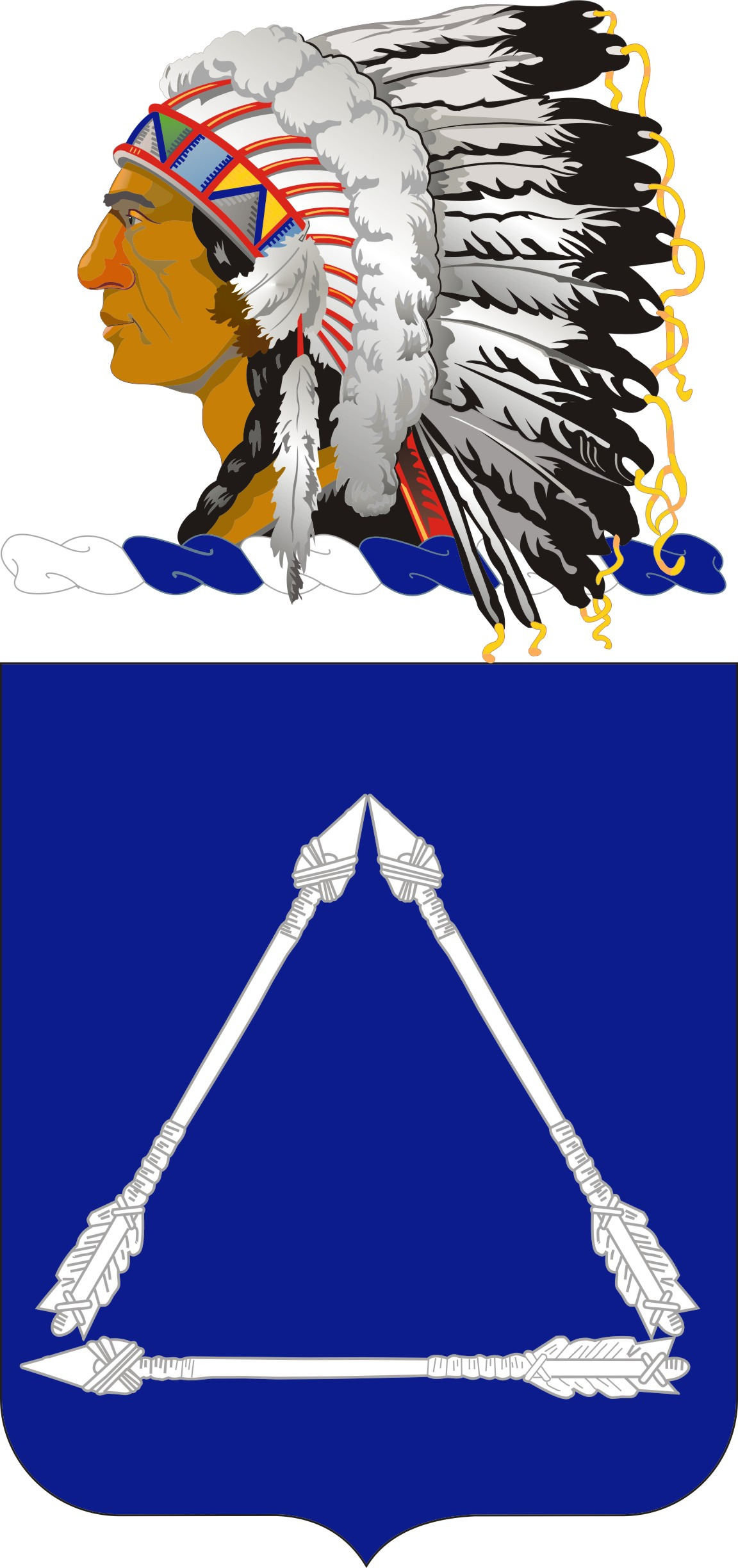
180th Infantry
(now 180th Cavalry)
"Tanap-Nanaiya Kia Alhtaiyaha" (Ready in War or Peace)
"Oklahoma Warriors"

181st Infantry
"Keep Your Powder Dry"

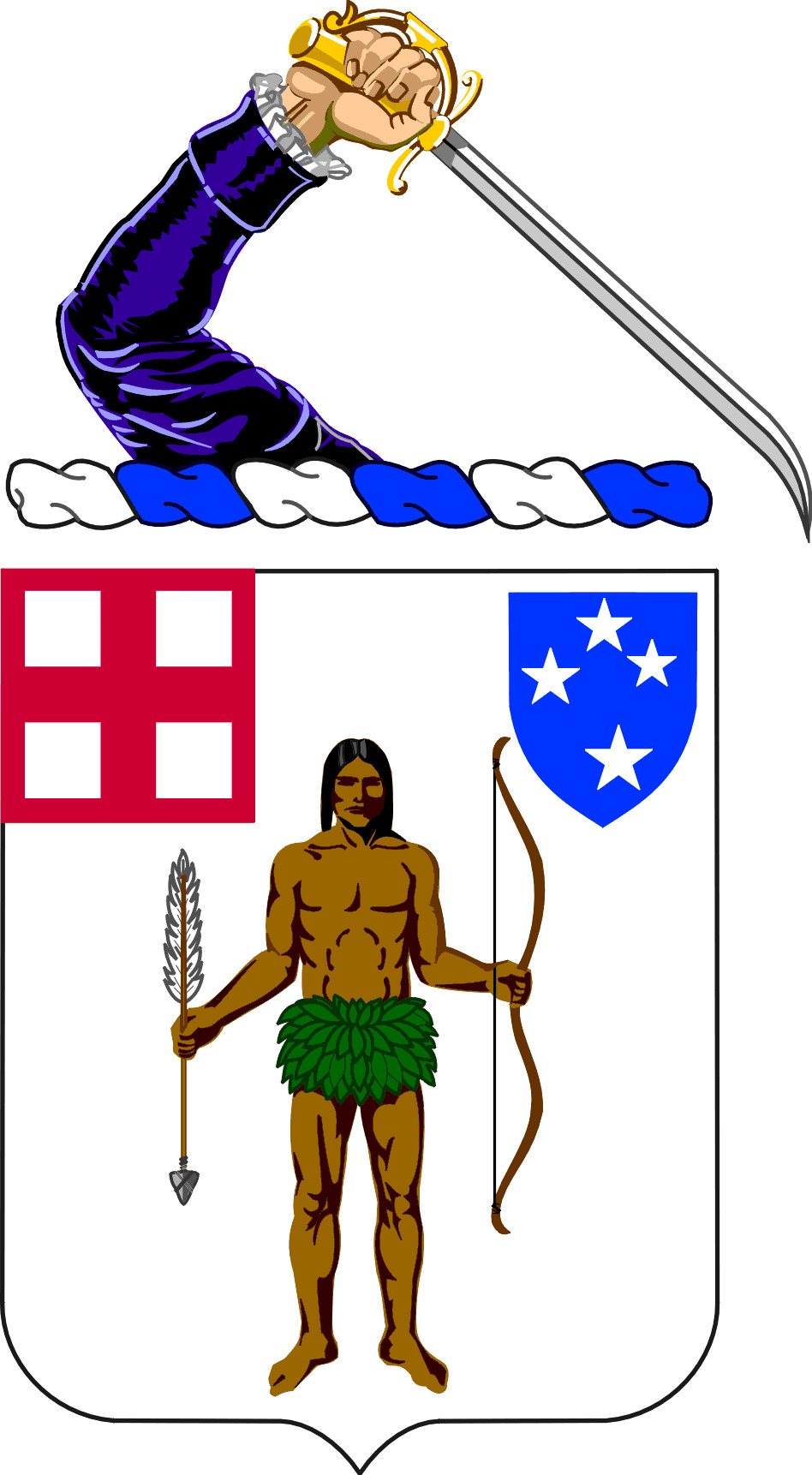
182nd Infantry
(now 182nd Cavalry)
"Avitos Juvamus Honores" (We Uphold Our Ancient Honors)

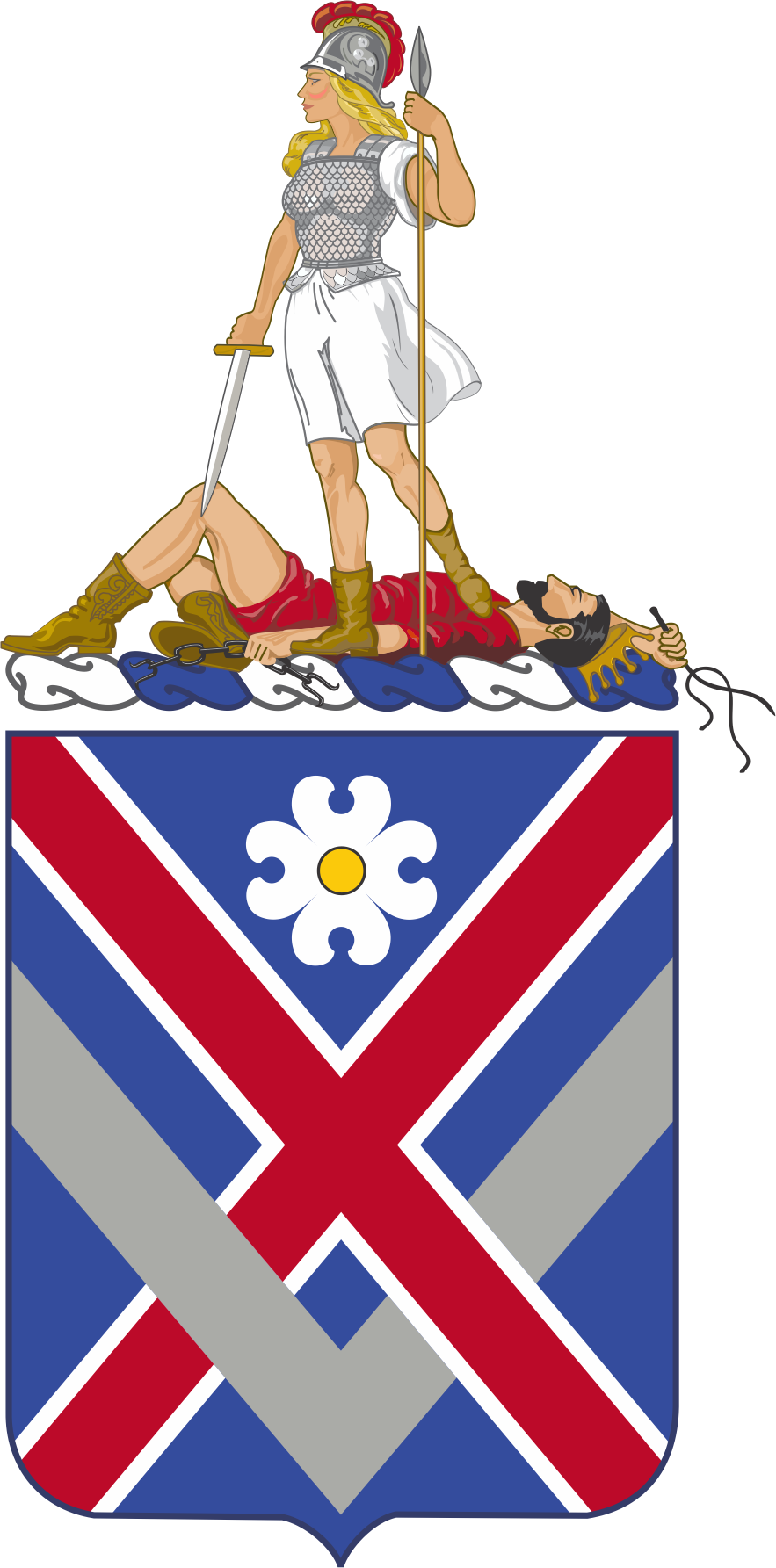
183rd Infantry
(now 183rd Cavalry)
"Death to Tyrants"

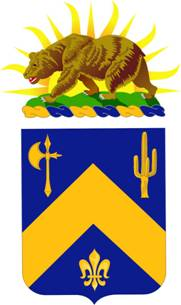
184th Infantry
"Let's Go!"

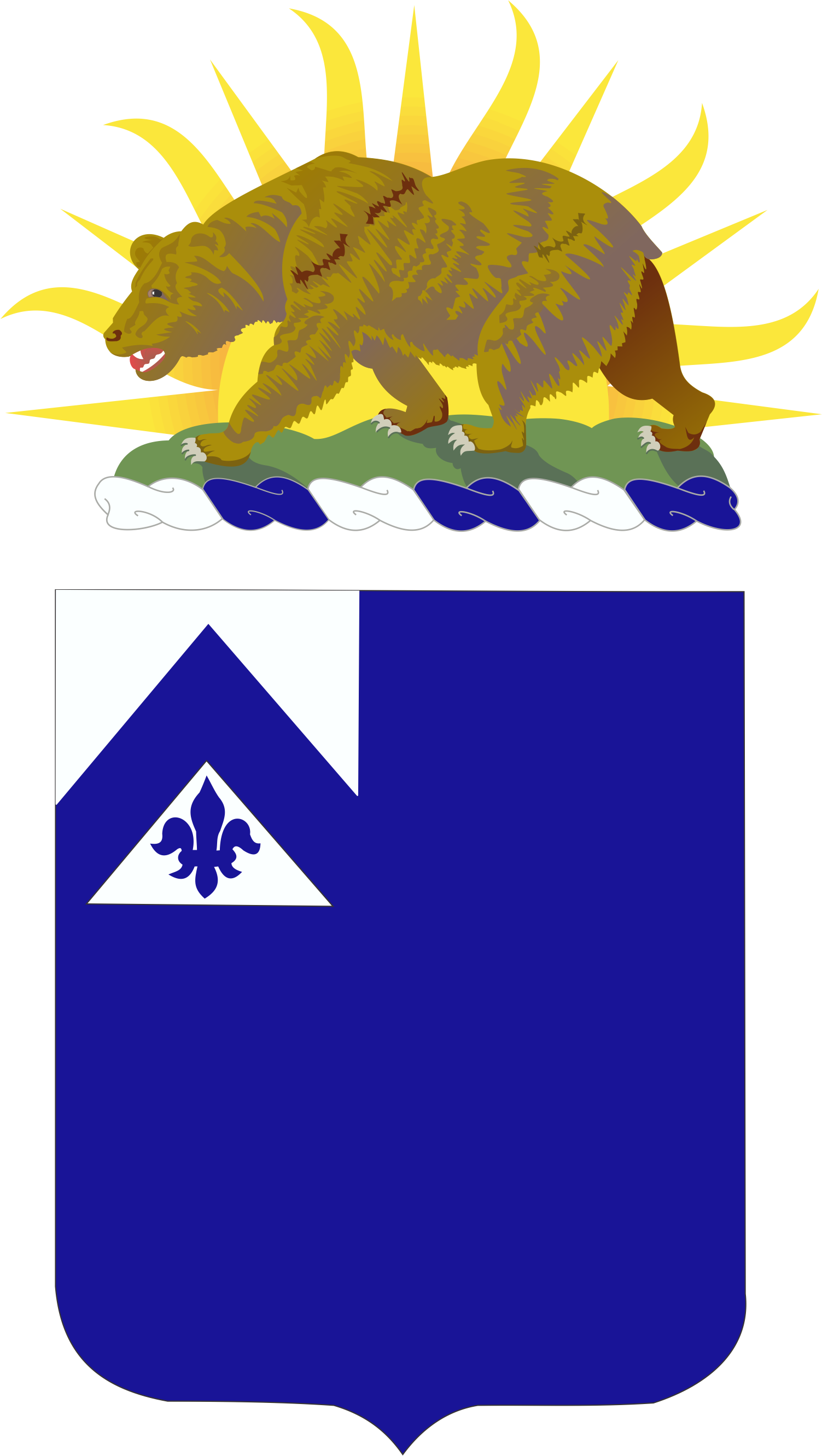
185th Infantry
"Nunquom Non Paratus" (Never unprepared)

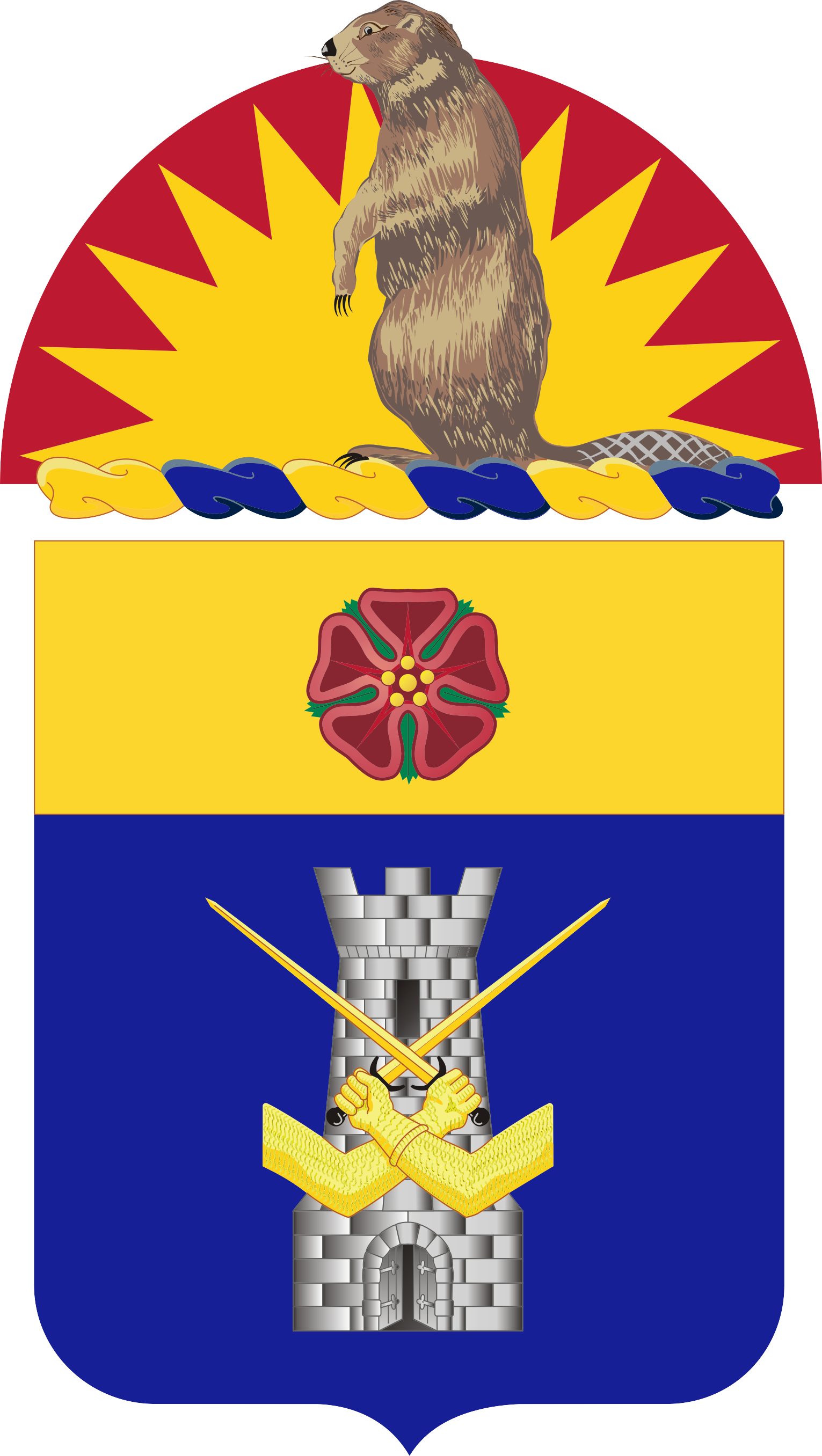
186th Infantry
"Custodes Portae Occidents" (Guardians of the Western Gates)

187th Infantry
"Ne Desit Virtus" (Let Valor Not Fail)
"Rakkasans"

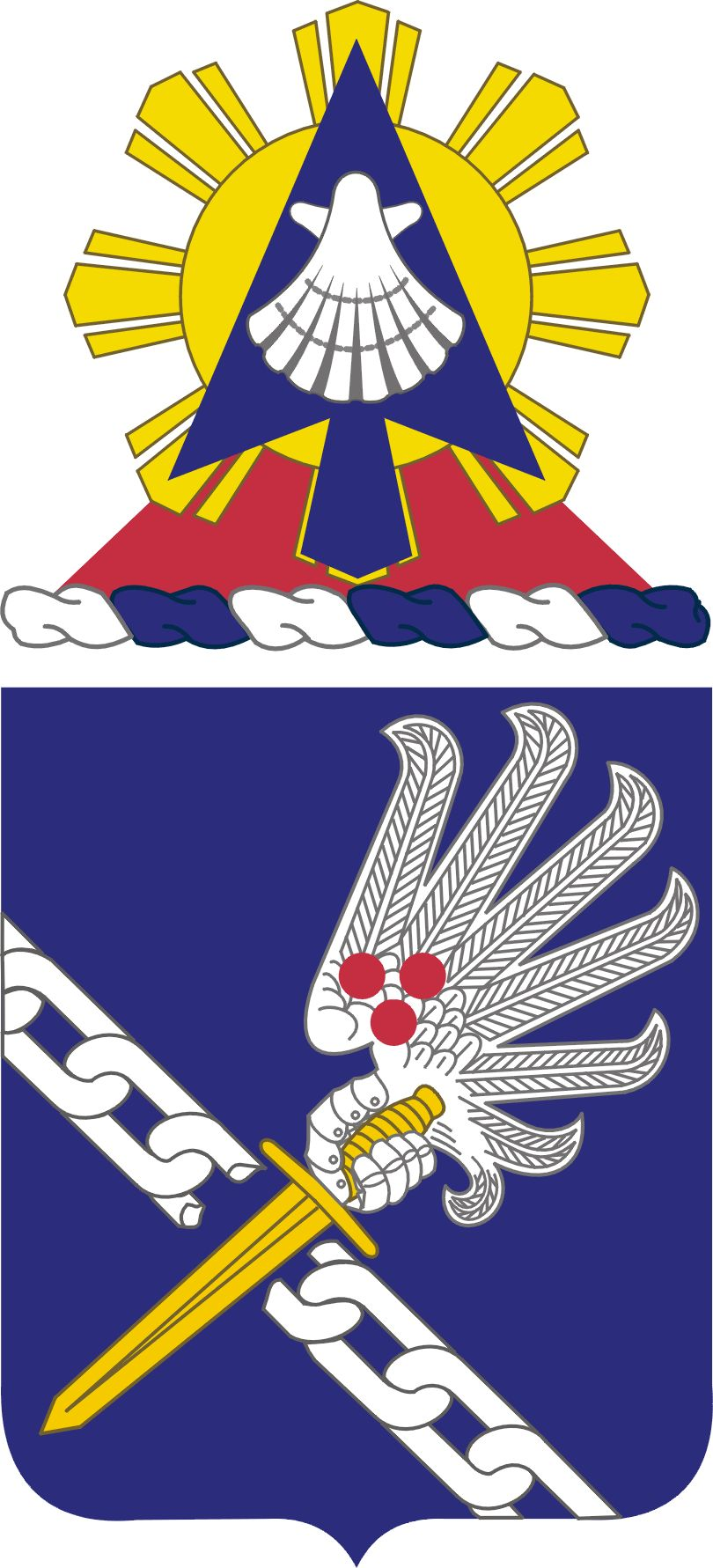
188th Infantry
"Winged Attack"

189th Infantry
(Glider)

190th Infantry
(Glider)

191st Infantry
(Glider)

192nd Infantry
(Glider)

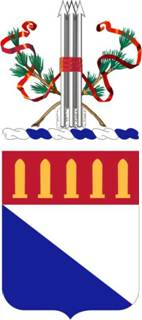
195th Infantry
"Take and Hold"

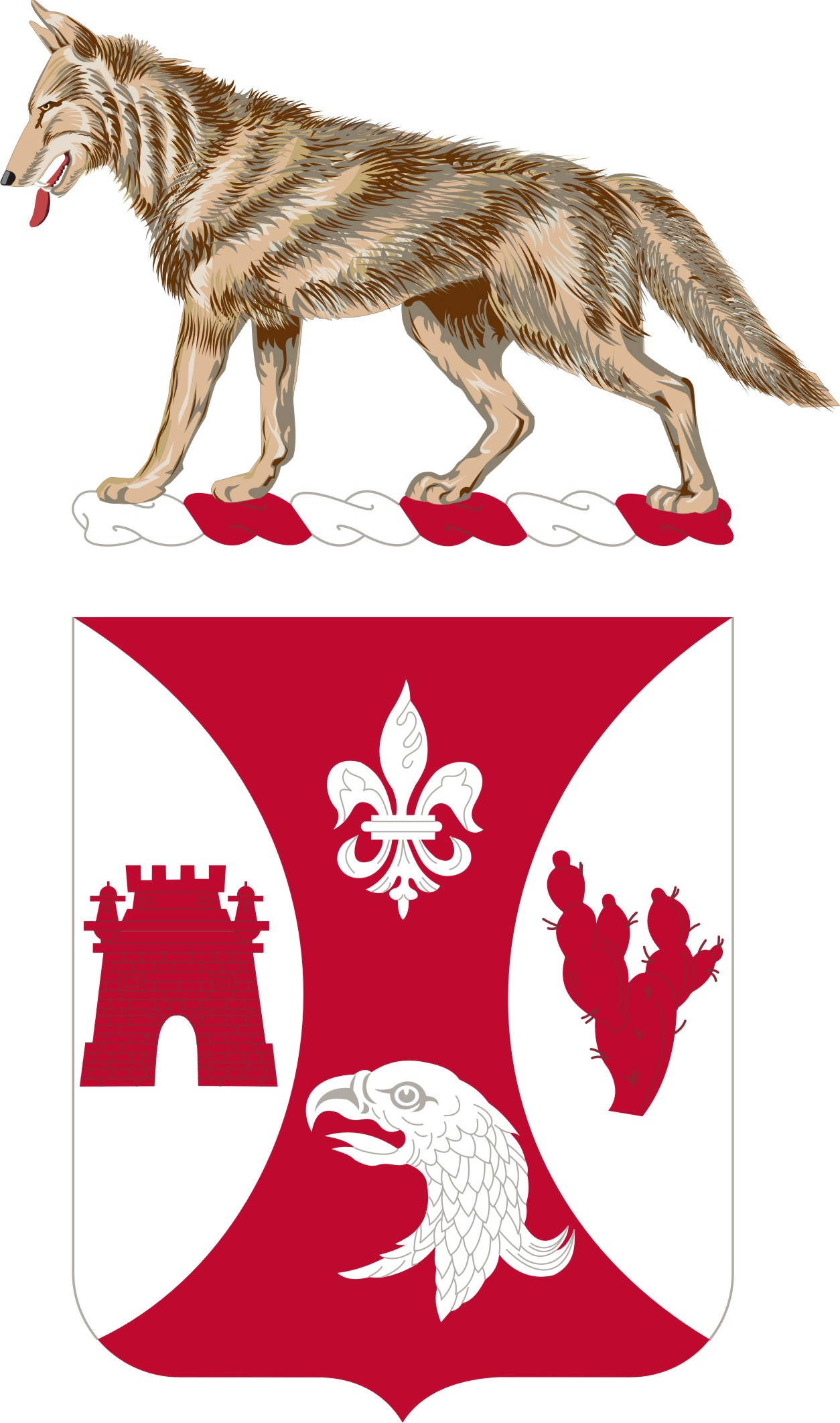
196th Infantry
"Nunce et Semper" (Now and Always)

197th Infantry

198th Infantry

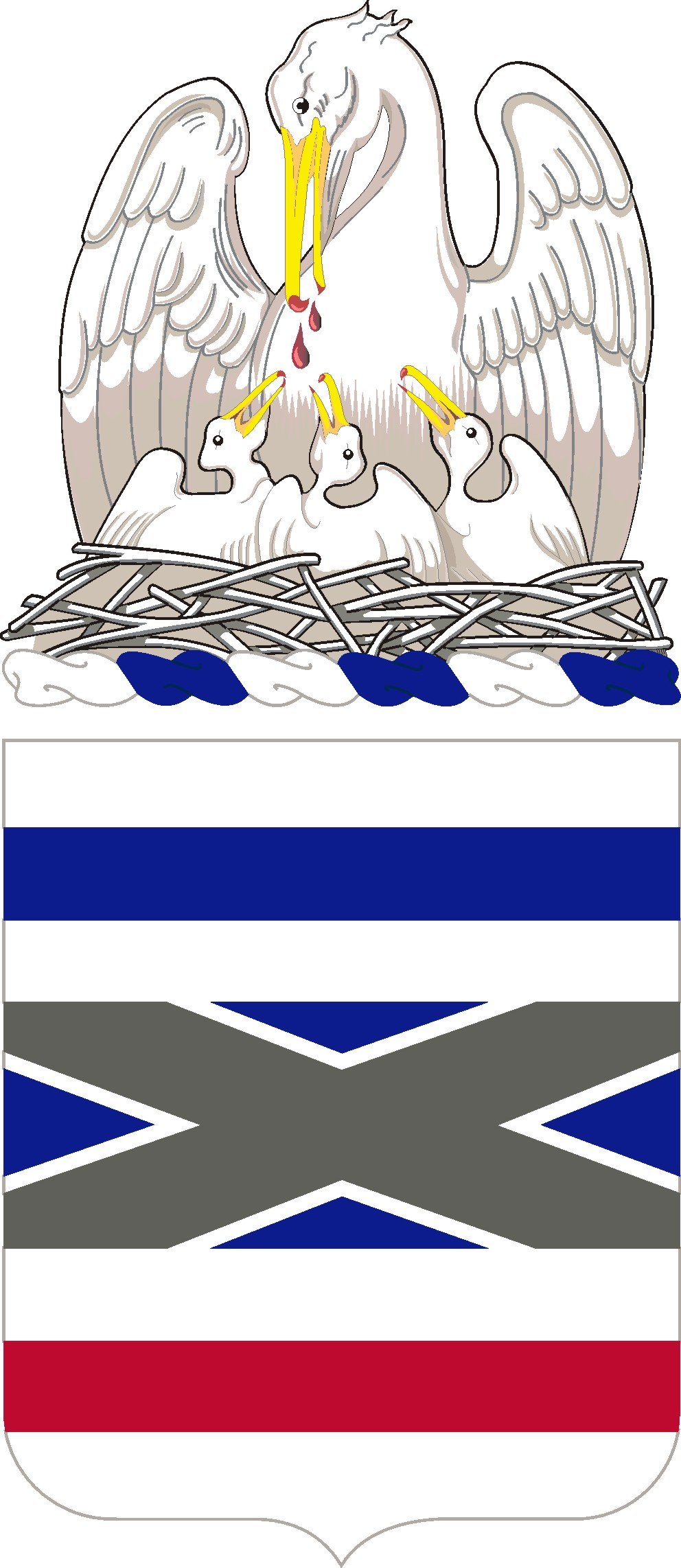
199th Infantry
"Nous sommes pret" (We Are Ready)

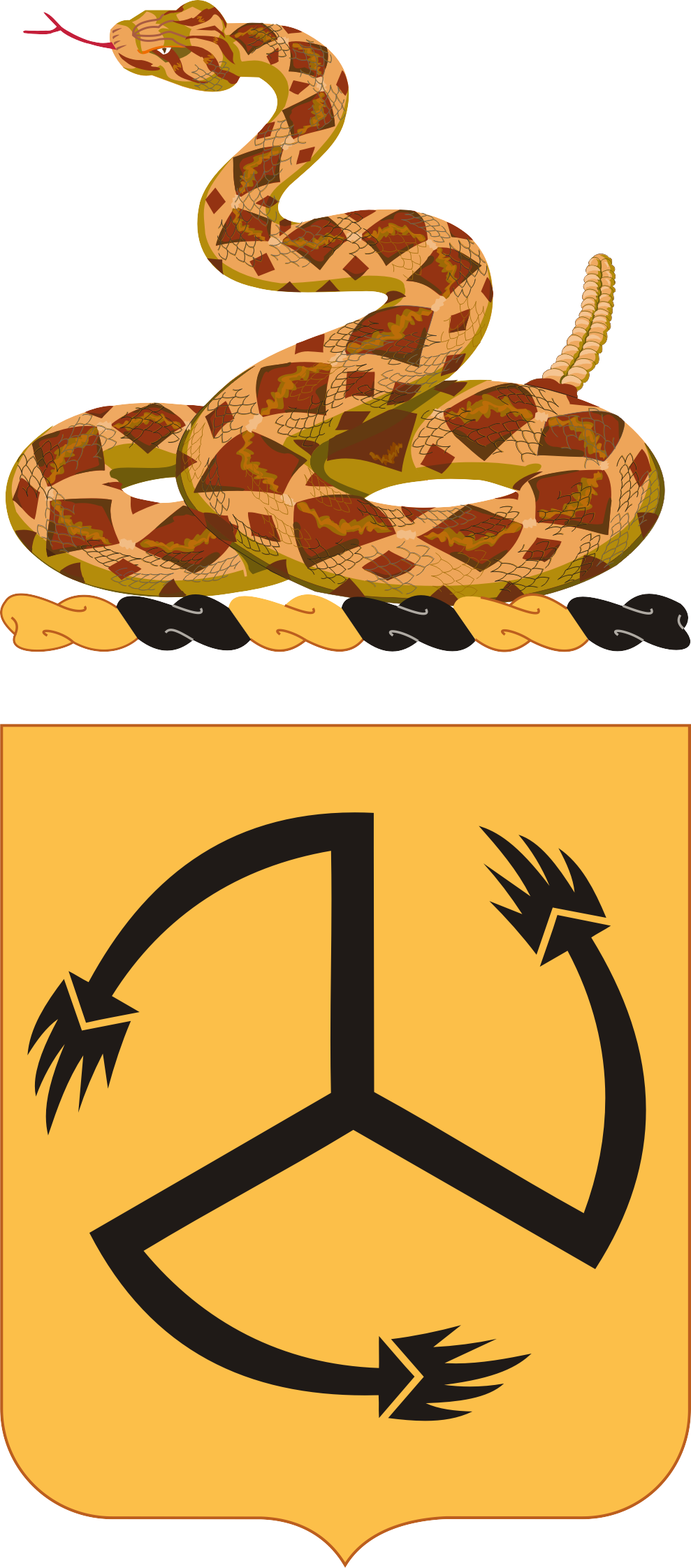
200th Infantry
(formerly 111th Cavalry & 200th Air Defense Artillery)
"Pro Civitate et Patria" (For State and Country)

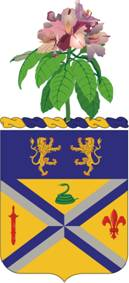
201st Infantry
(now 201st Field Artillery)
"Yes Sir"

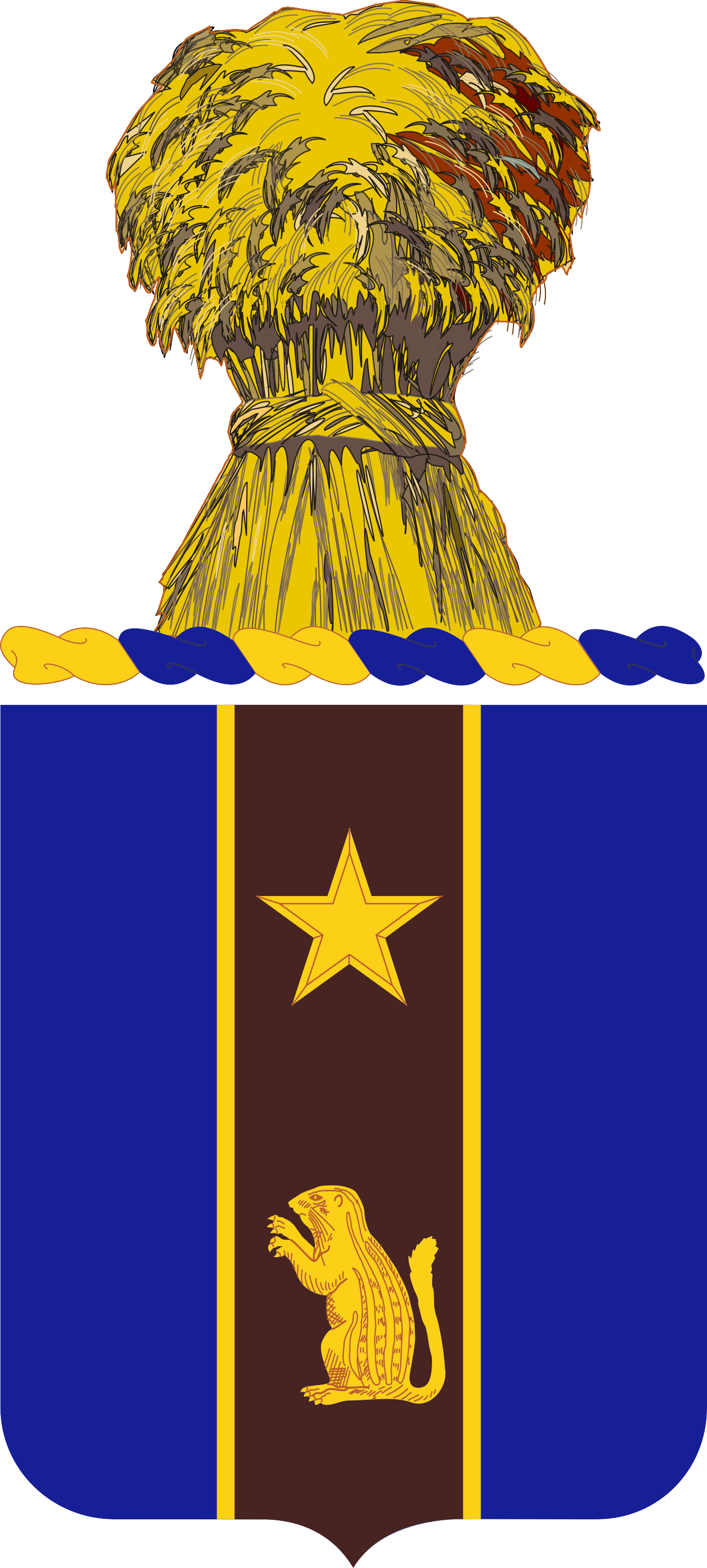
205th Infantry
"Pour la Patrie" (For native land)

206th Infantry
"For state and country"

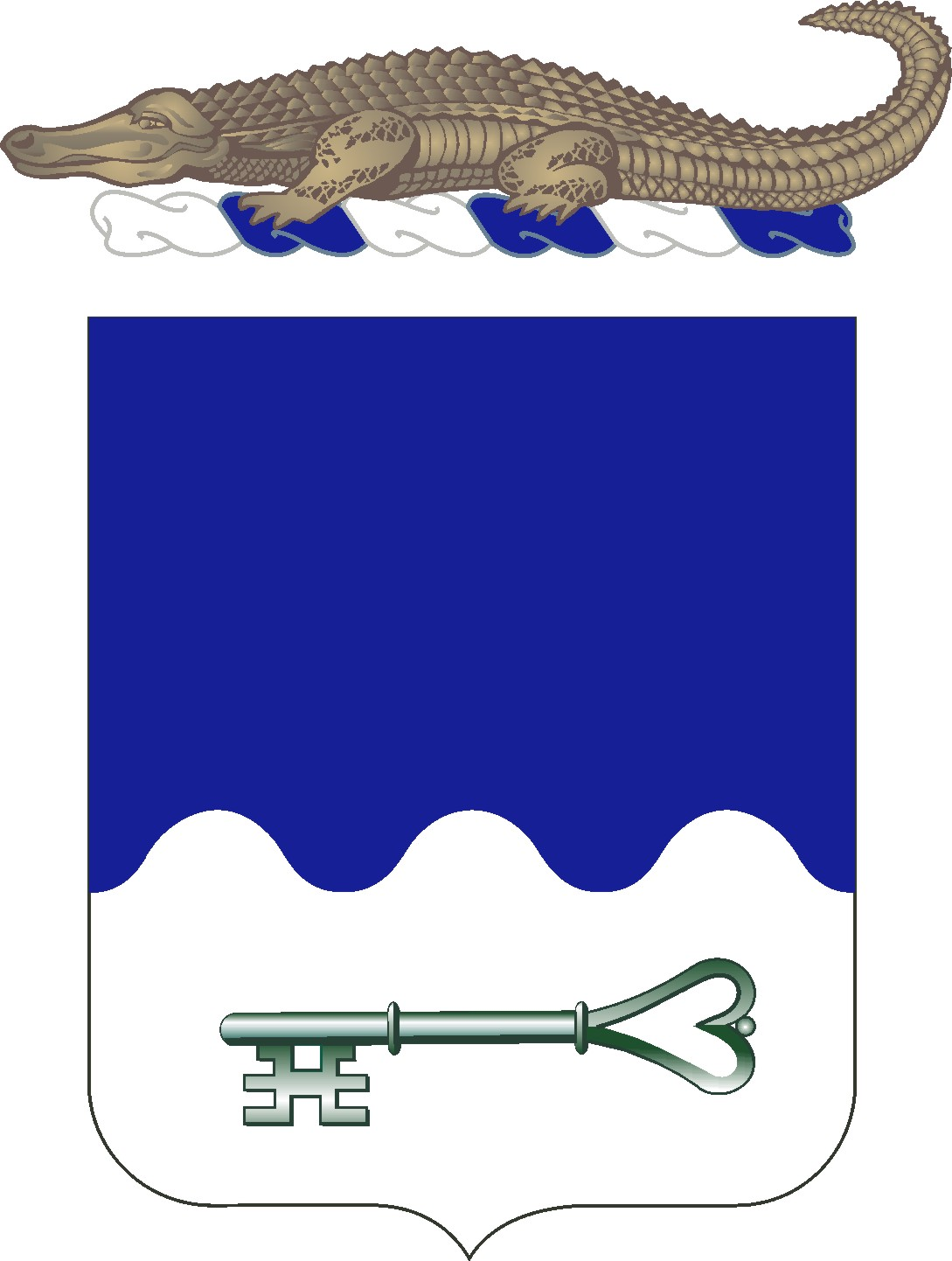
211th Infantry
"Paroneri" (Equal To The Task)

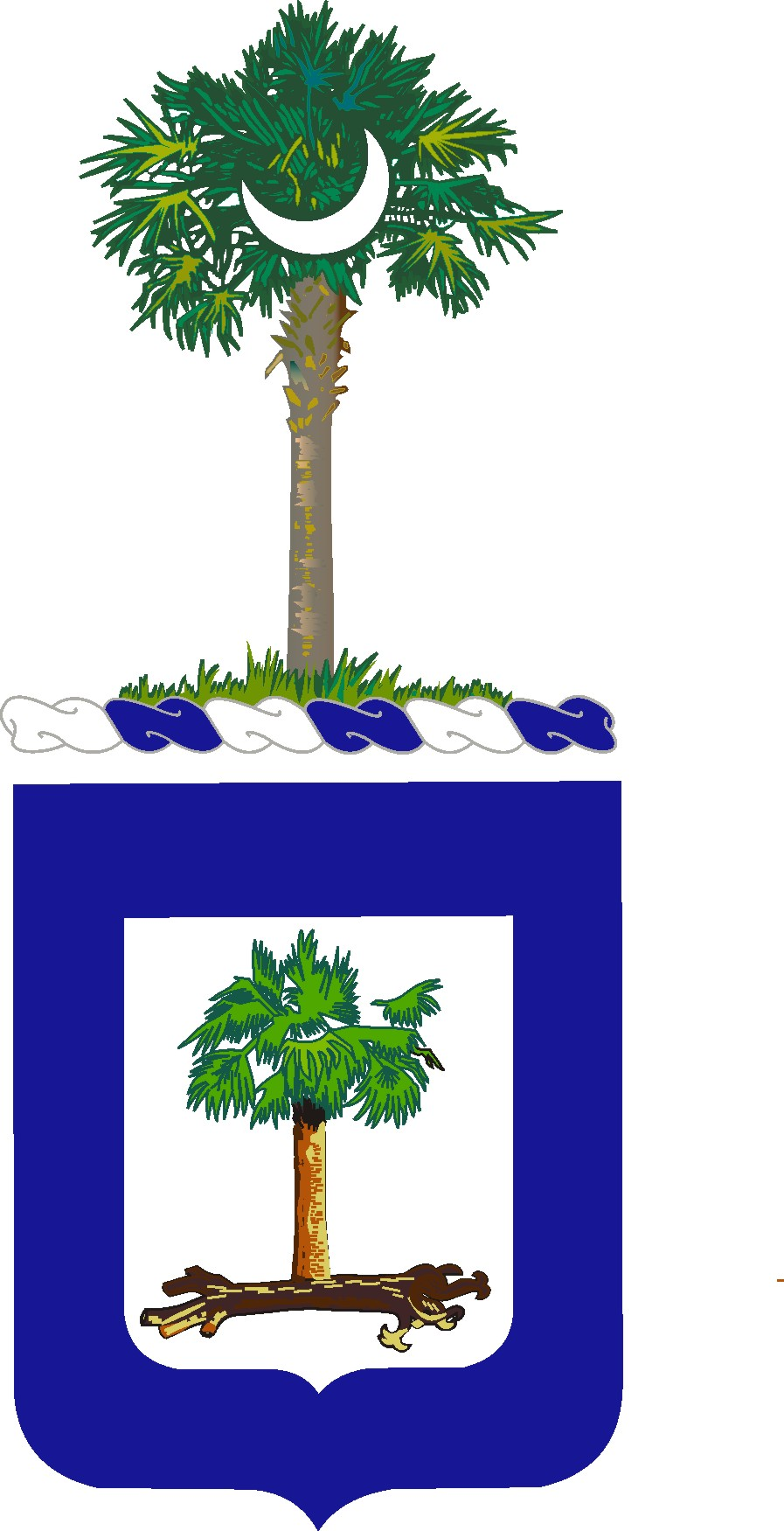
218th Infantry
"Constans Animis" (Steadfast Of Purpose)

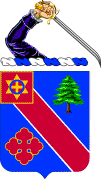
220 Infantry
(now 211th Military Police Battalion)
"Monstrat Viam" (It Points the Way)

224th Infantry
"Persevertentia Triumphat" (Perseverance Triumphs)

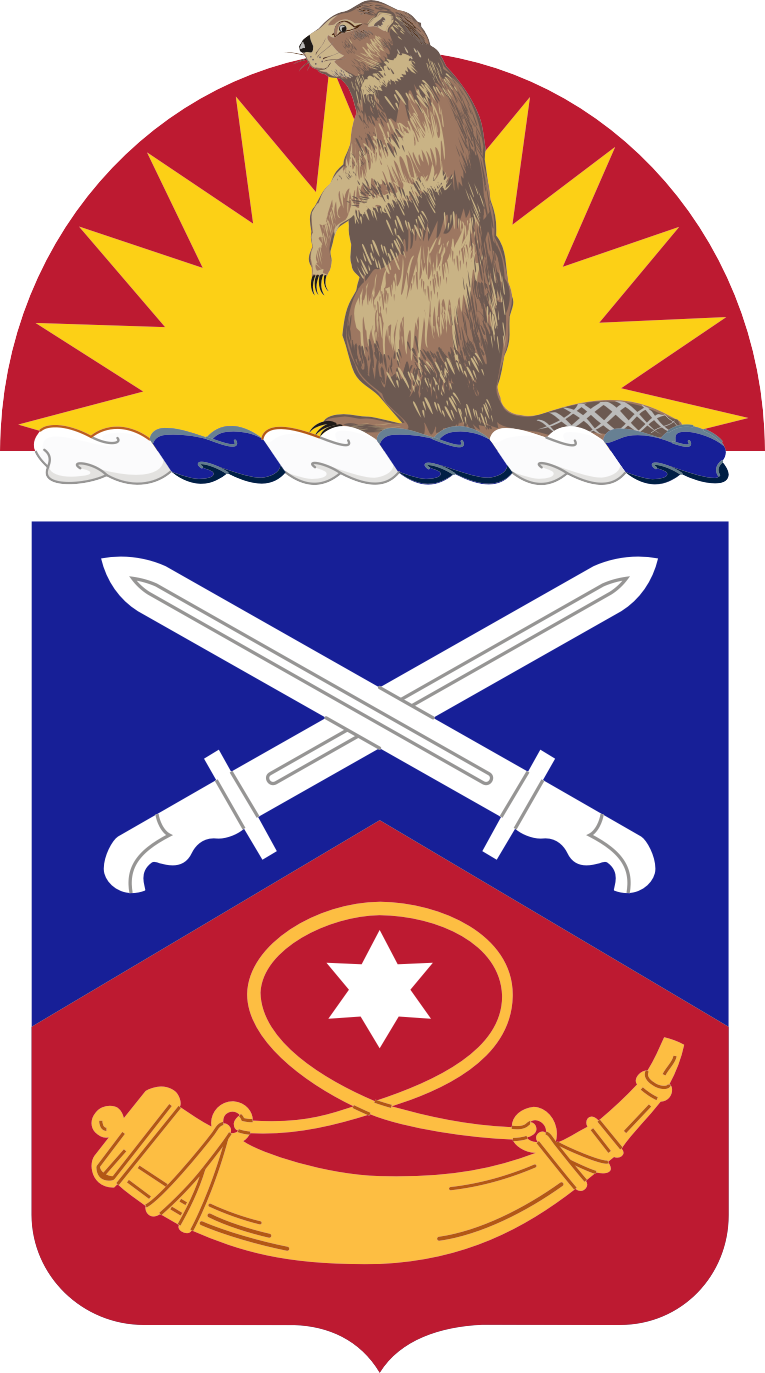
249th Infantry
"Destroy in Depth"

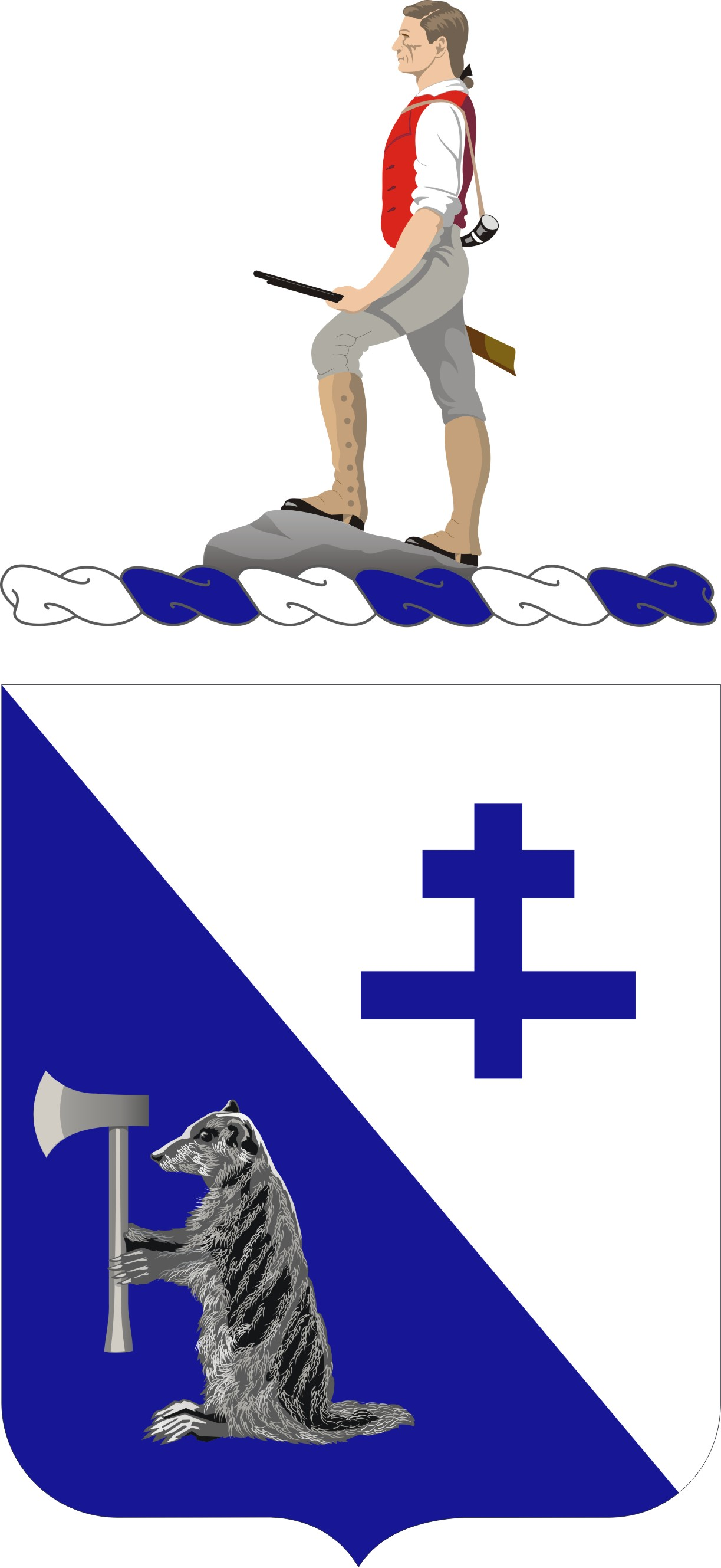
274th Infantry
"L’Avant Garde" (The Vanguard)

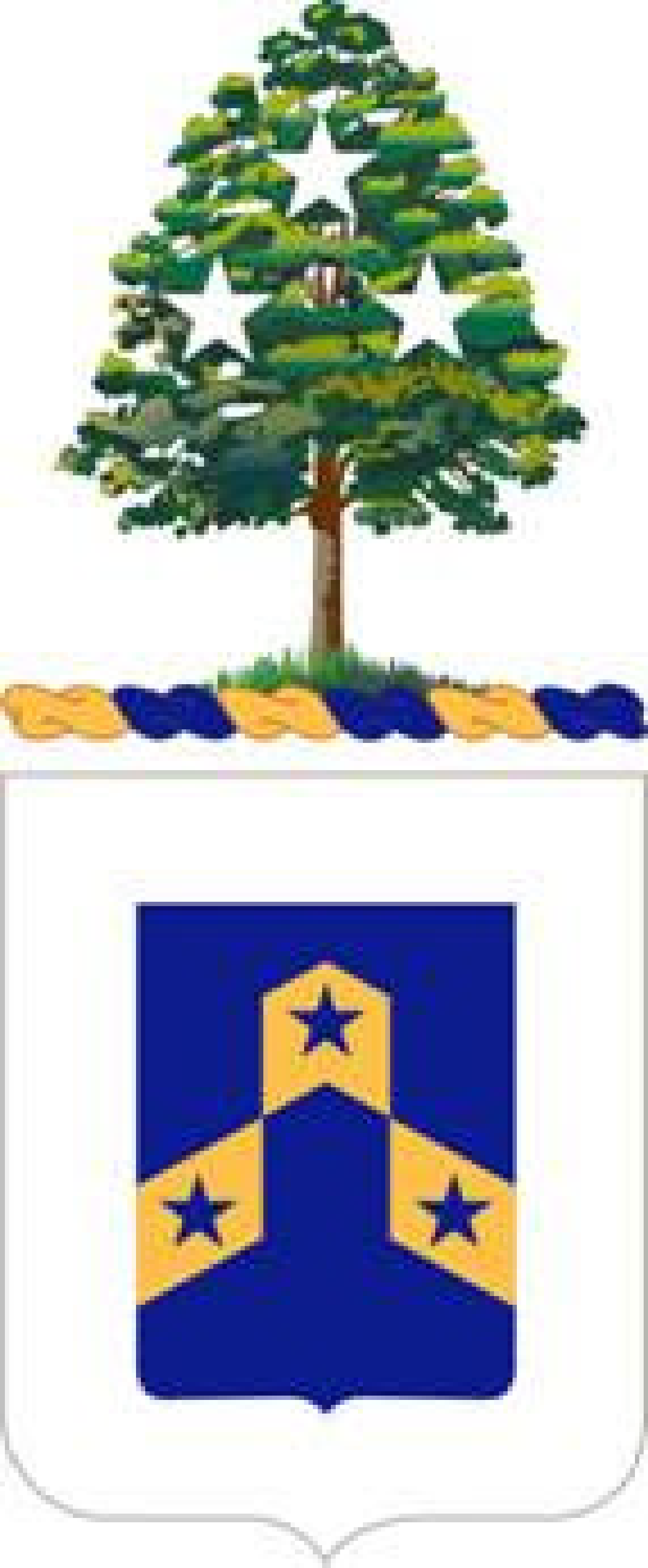
278th Infantry
(later 278th Armored Infantry Battalion)
"Fustest With the Mostest"

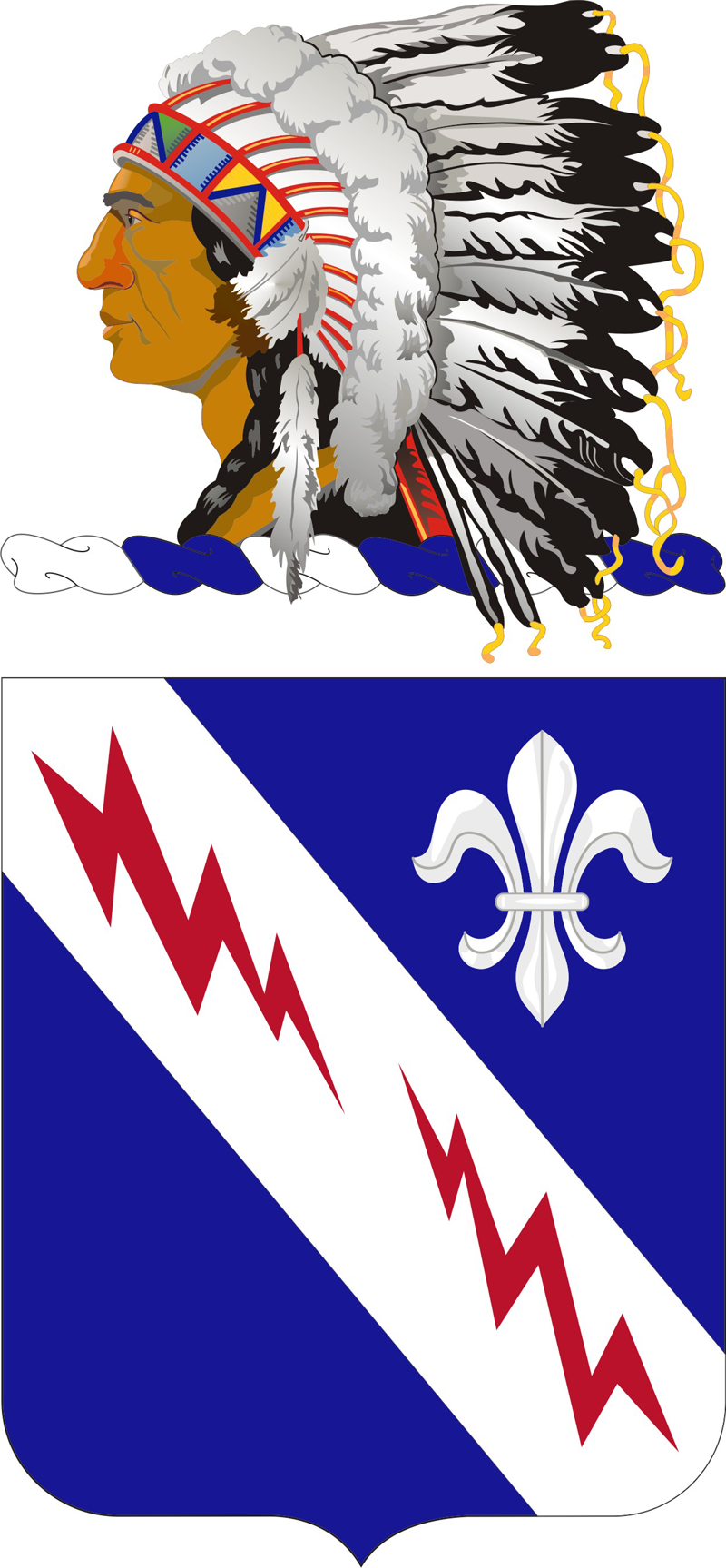
279th Infantry
"Movin' On"

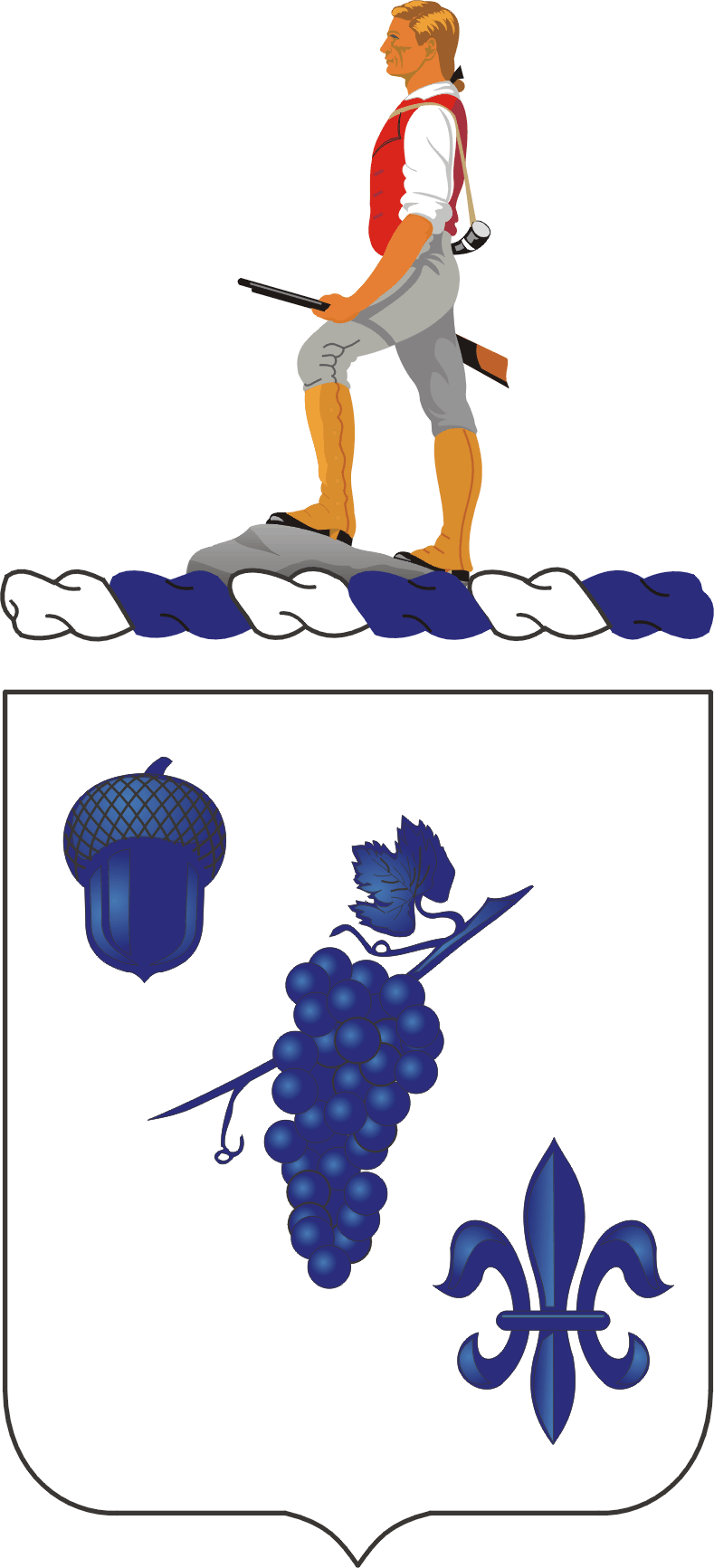
289th Infantry
"Vincere Aut Mori" (To Conquer or To Die)

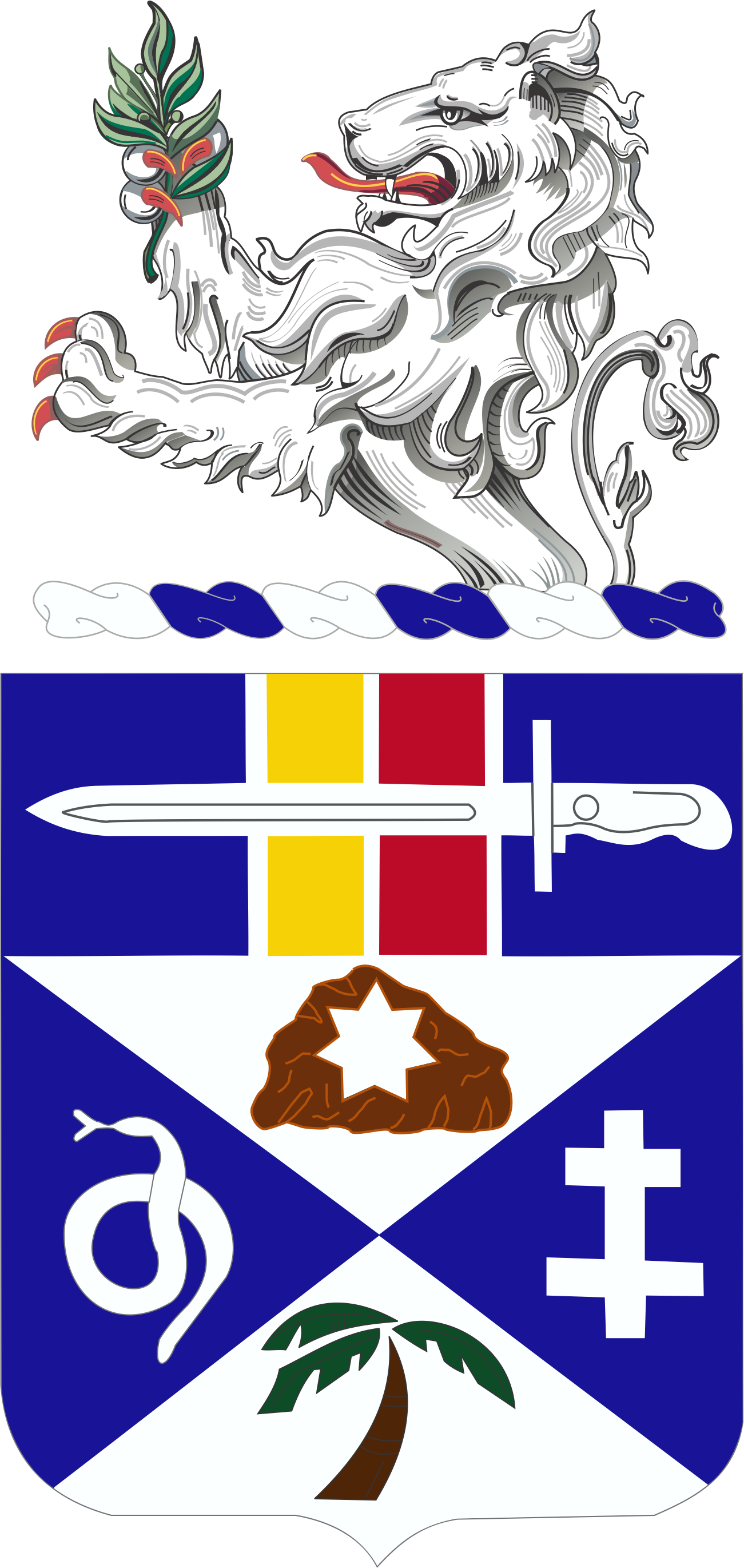
293rd Infantry
"Follow Us"

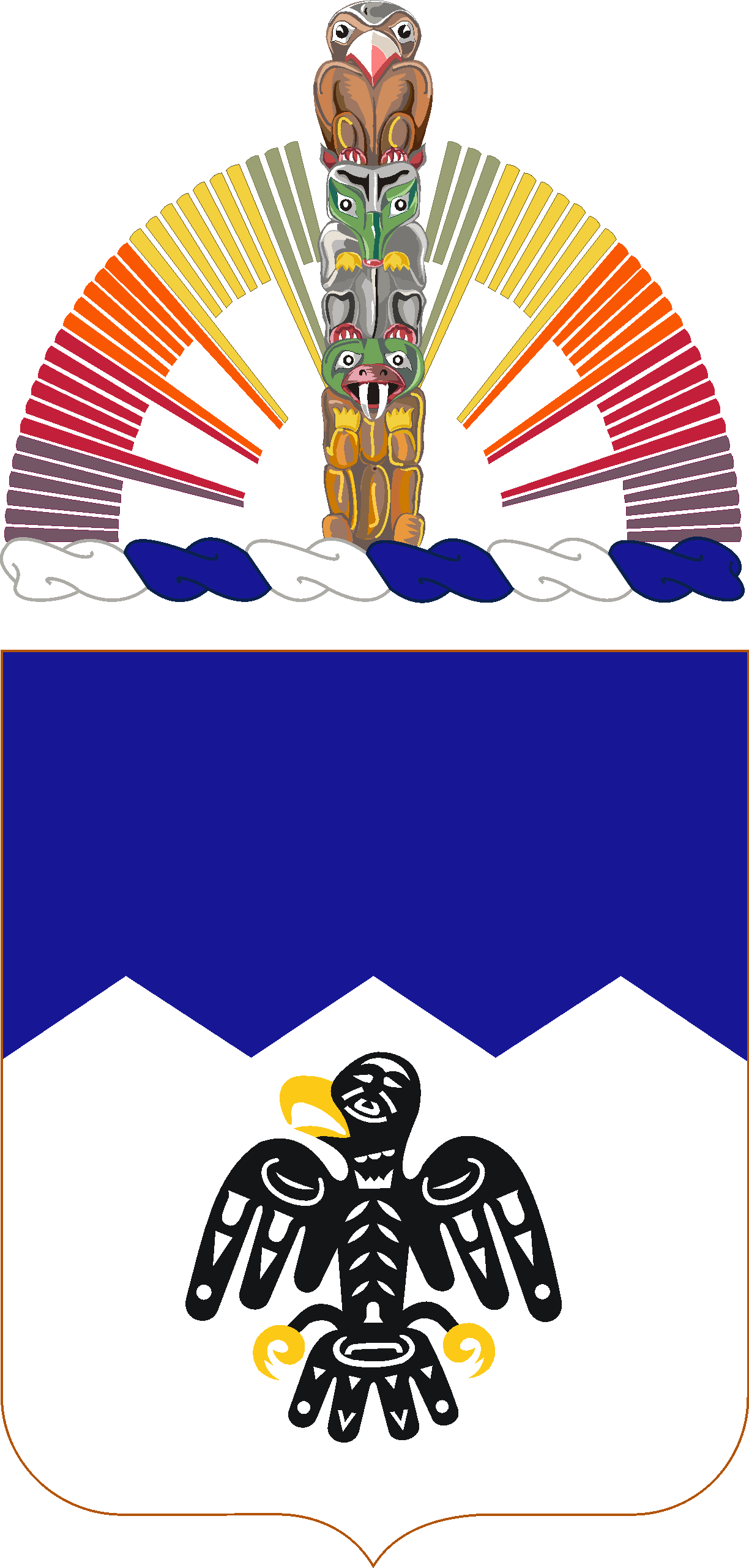
297th Infantry
"YUH YEK" (Vigilance, Watchfulness)

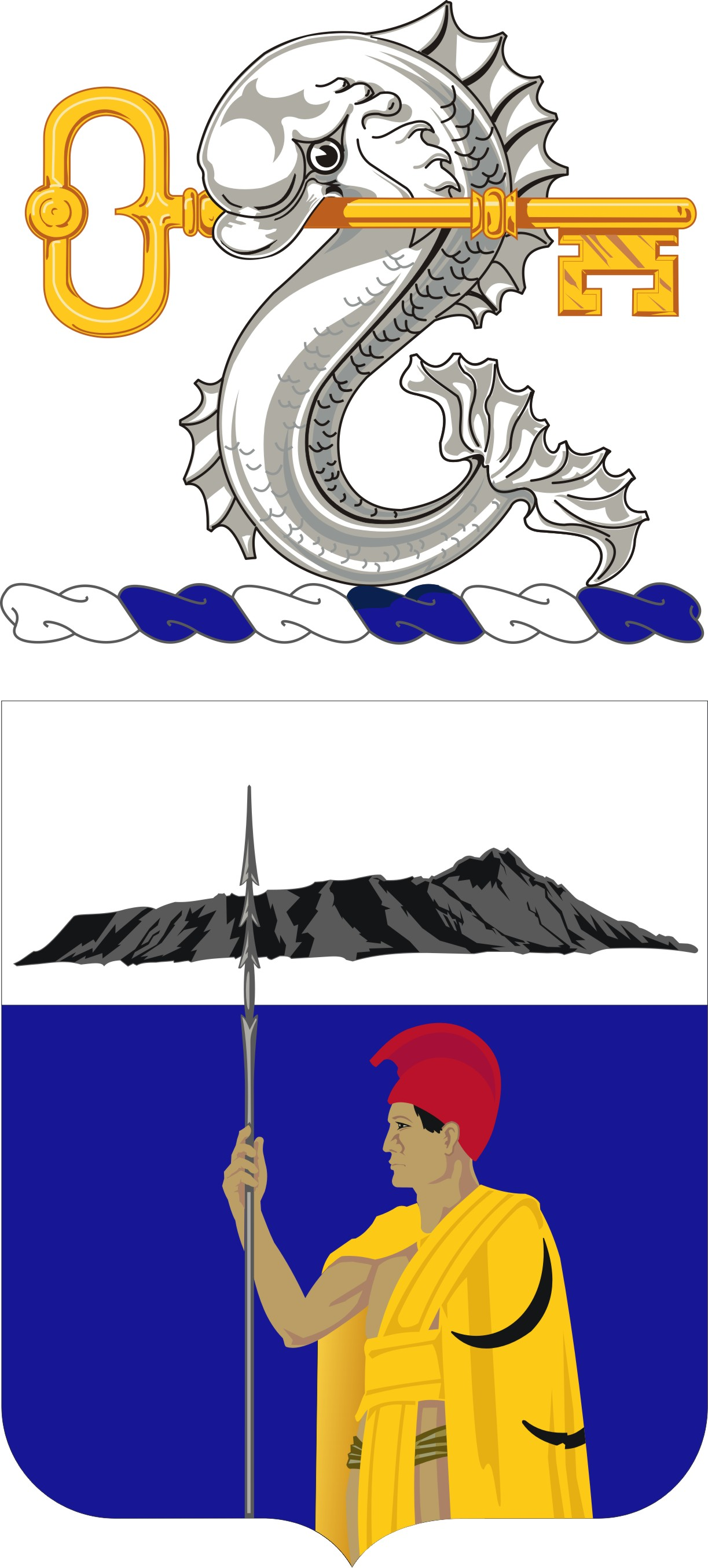
298th Infantry
"Makaukau Kakou" (We Are Prepared)

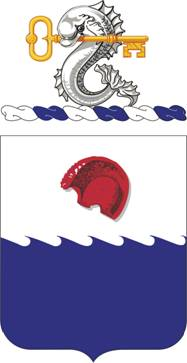
299th Infantry
(now 299th Cavalry)
"E Makaala Kakou"

=== 301 to 400 ===
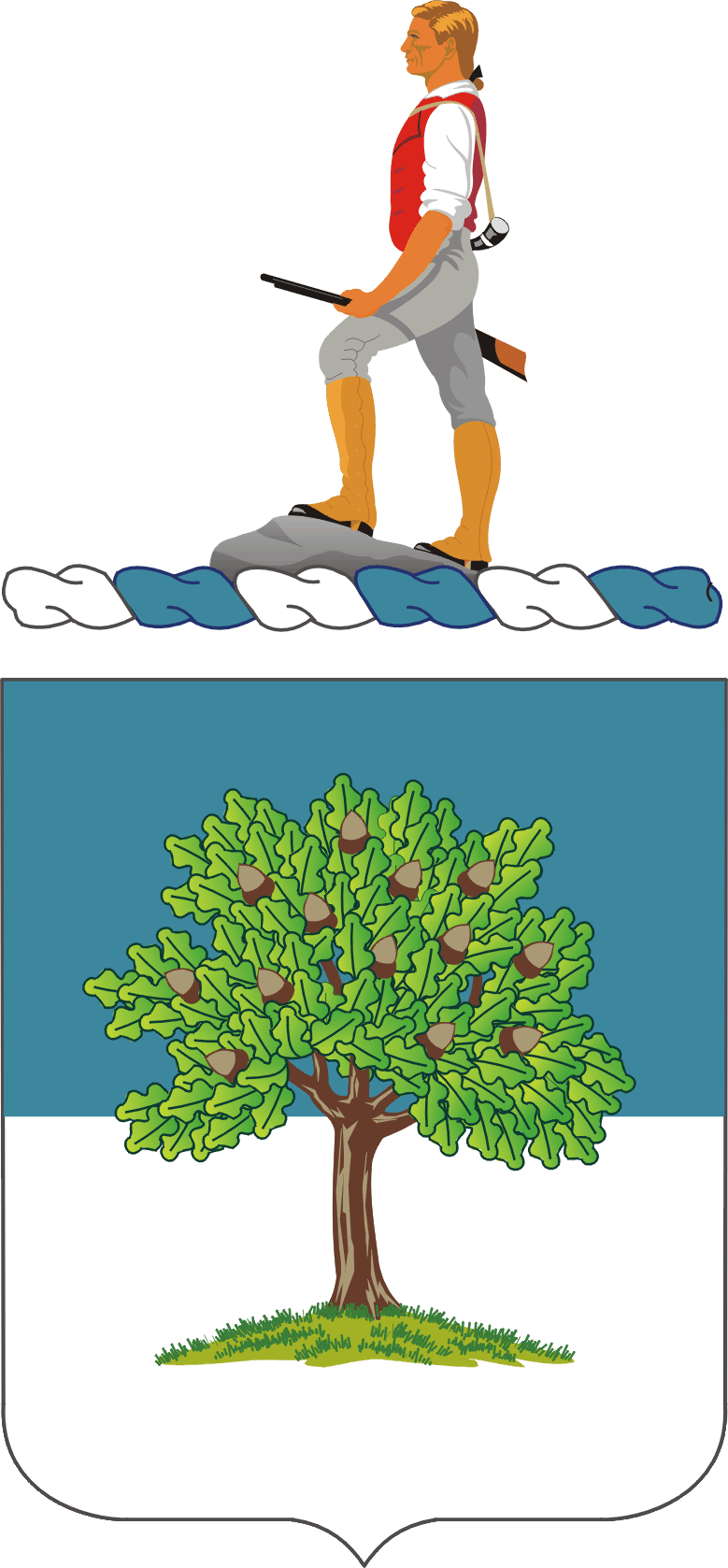
304th Infantry
"Forward"

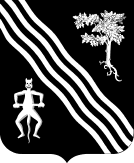
305th Infantry (Note: United States Army Reserve unit crest not shown)
"Second To None"

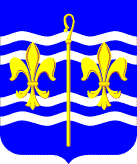
306th Infantry
"Suivez-Moi"

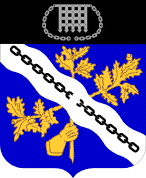
307th Infantry
(now 307th Regiment)
"Clear the Way"

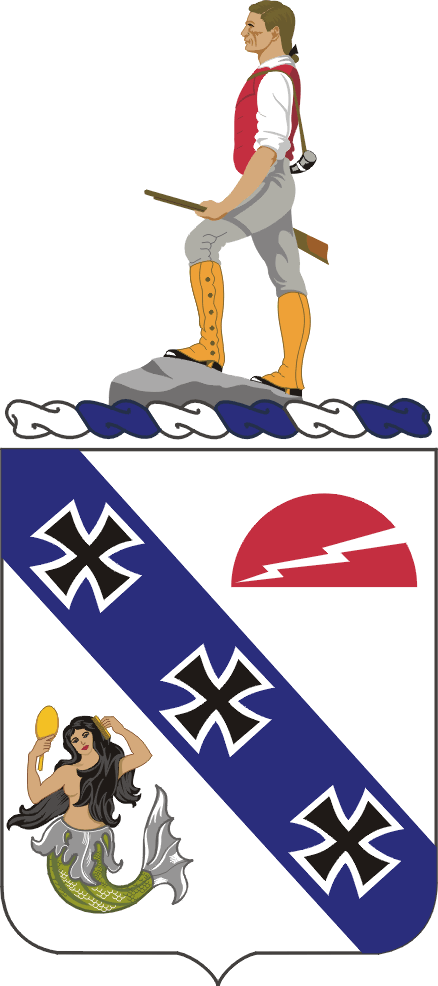
309th Infantry
"w:Esse Quam Videri" (To Be Rather Than To Seem)

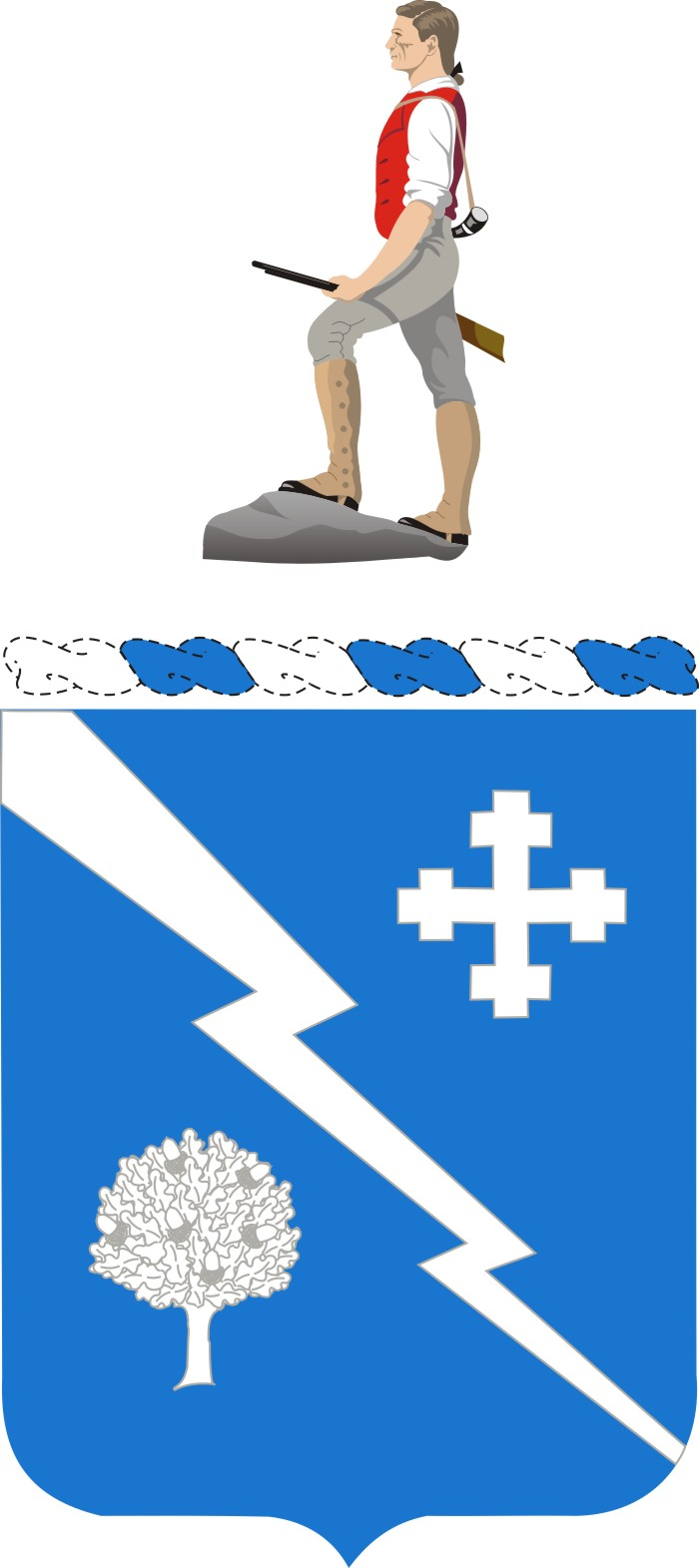
310th Infantry
"Allons mes enfants" (Forward, My Children)

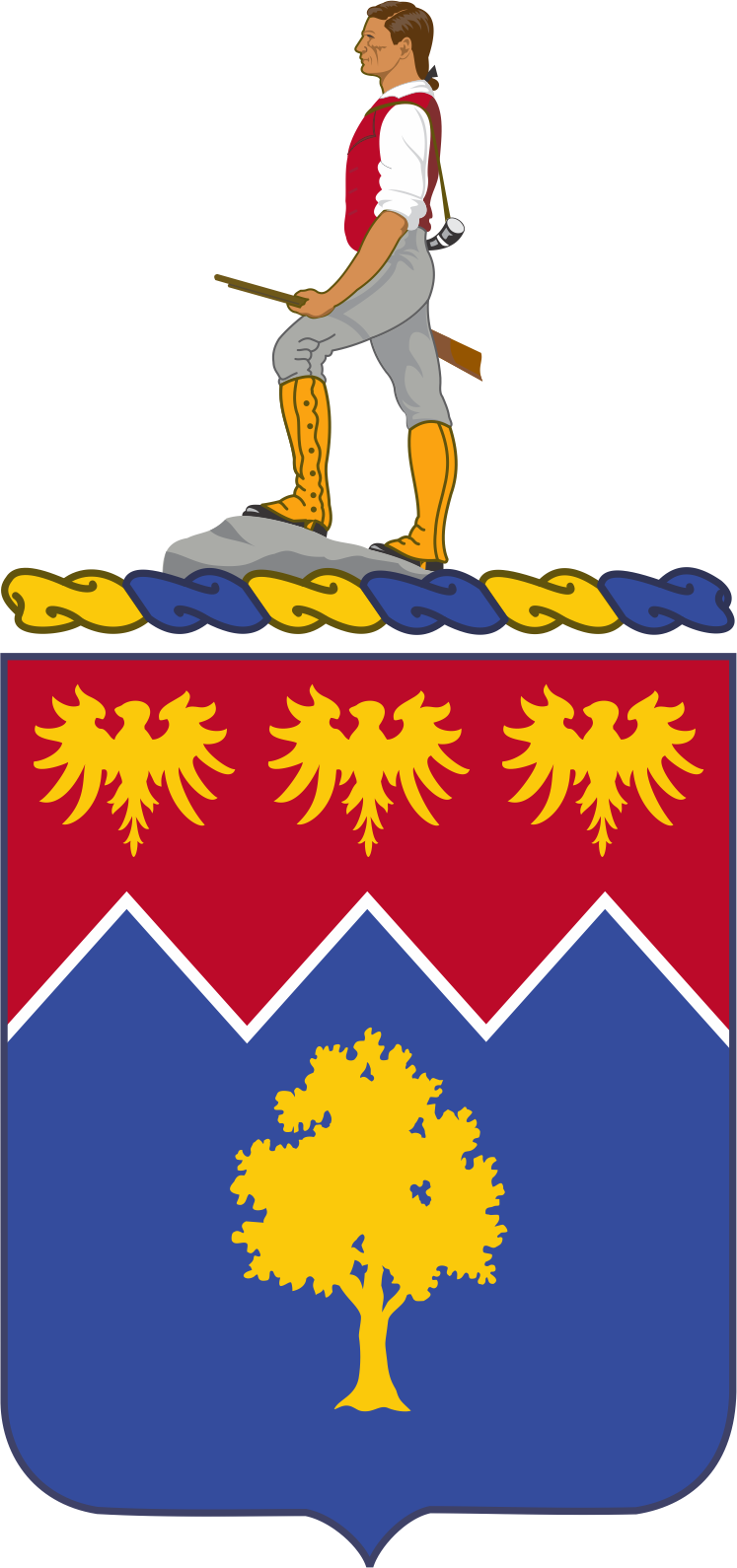
311th Infantry
(now 311th Regiment)
"Jamais Trop Tard" (Never Too Late)

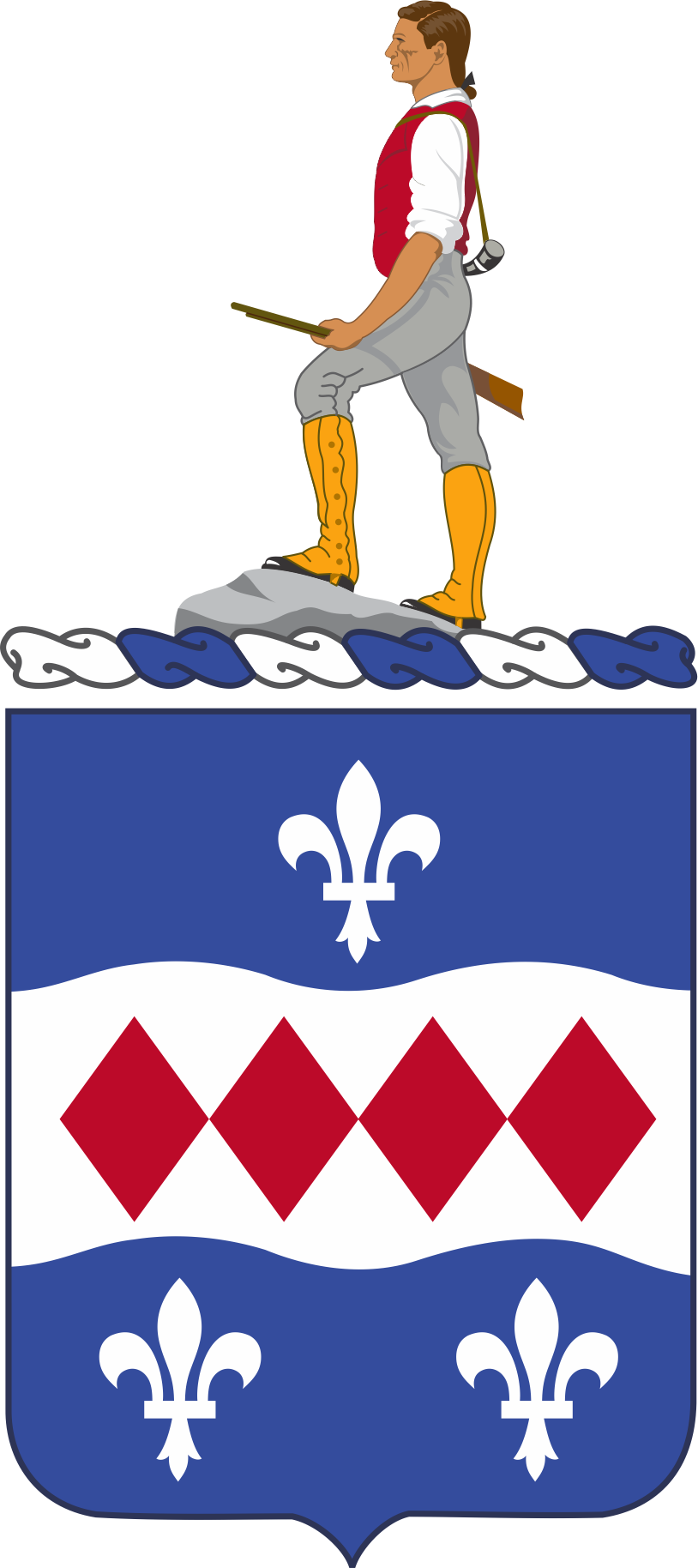
312th Infantry
(now 312th Regiment)
"Au Feu Toujours" (Always at the Fire)

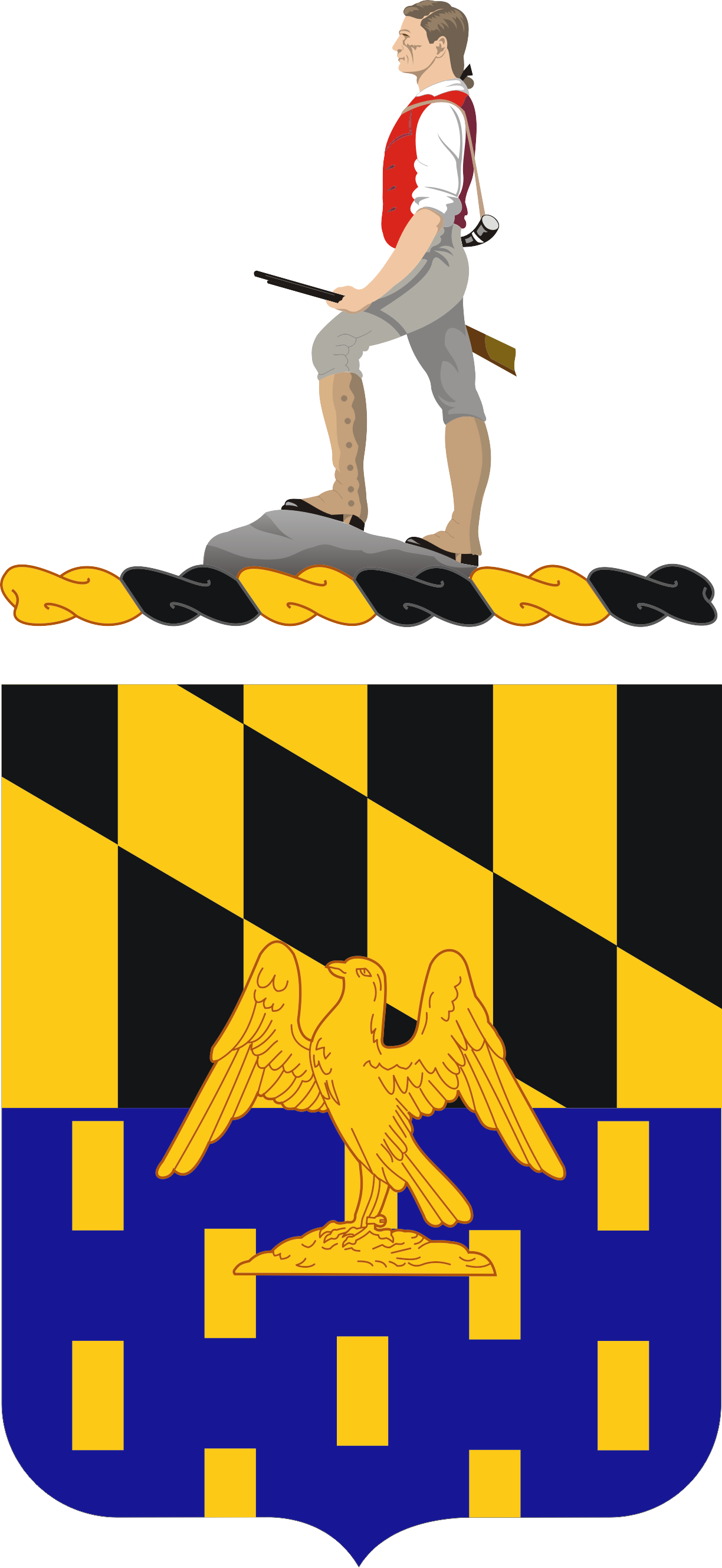
313th Infantry
"Virtute et fide" (By Bravery and Faith)

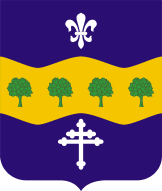
315th Infantry
(now 315th Regiment)
"Qui Me Tangit Paenitebit" (He who touches me will repent)

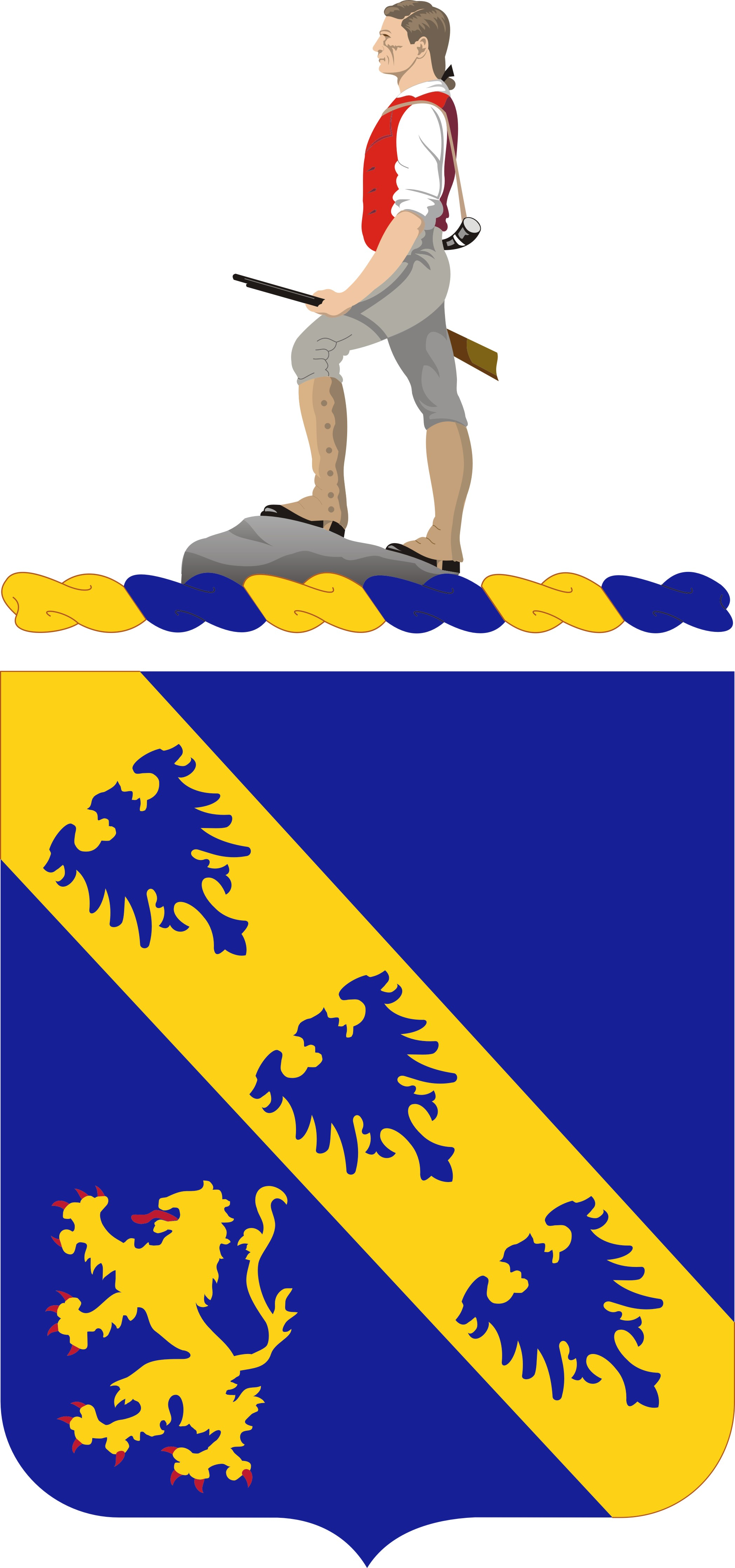
317th Infantry
"Armis et animis" (By Arms and By Courage)

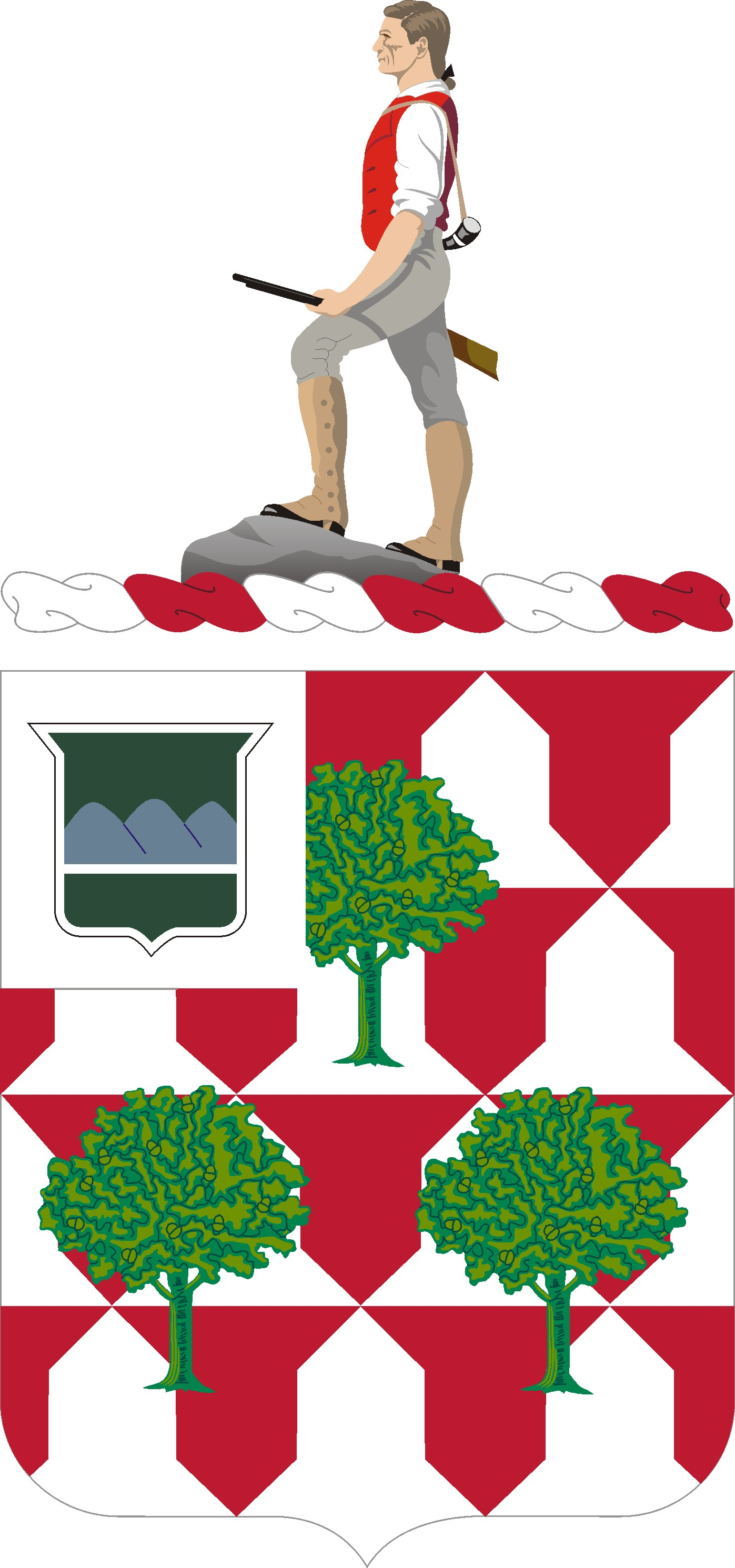
318th Infantry
(now 318th Regiment)
"Old Virginia never tires"

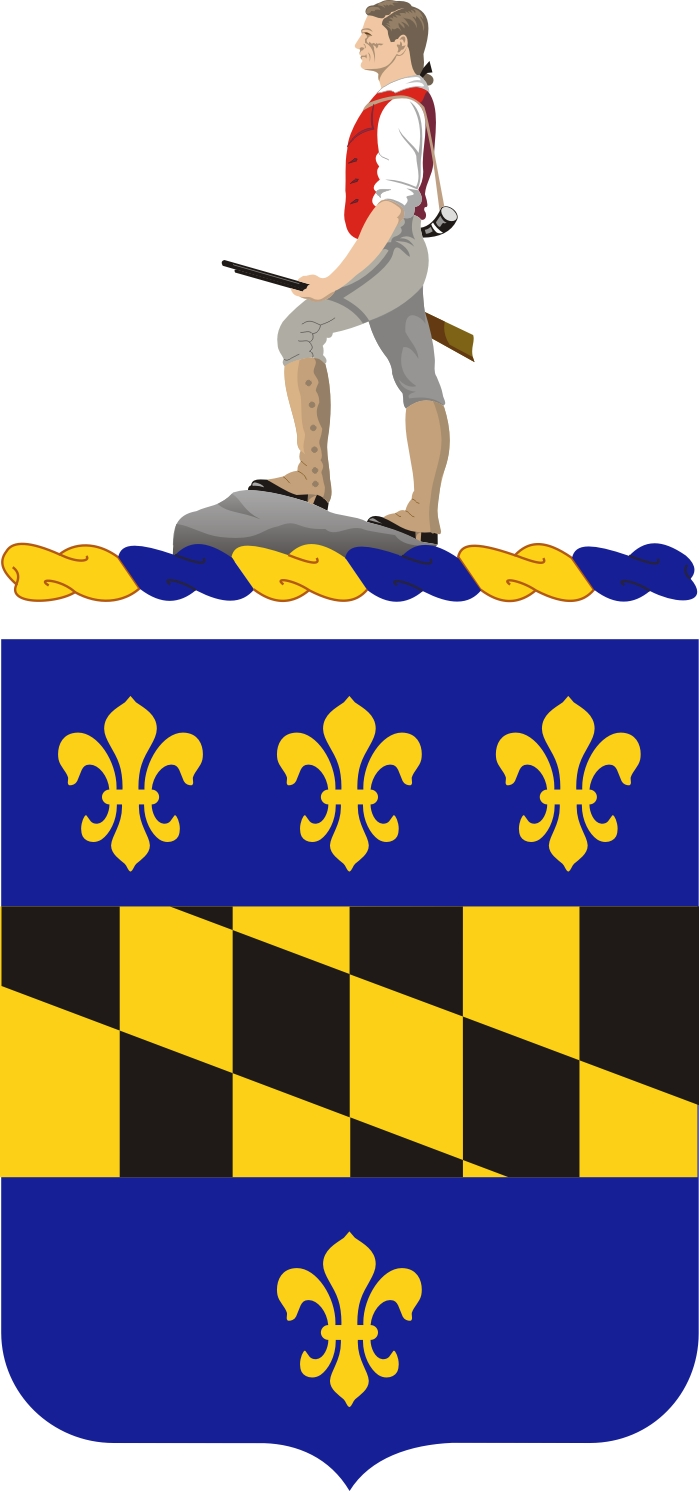
319th Infantry
(now 319th Regiment)
"Volens et potens" (Willing and Able)

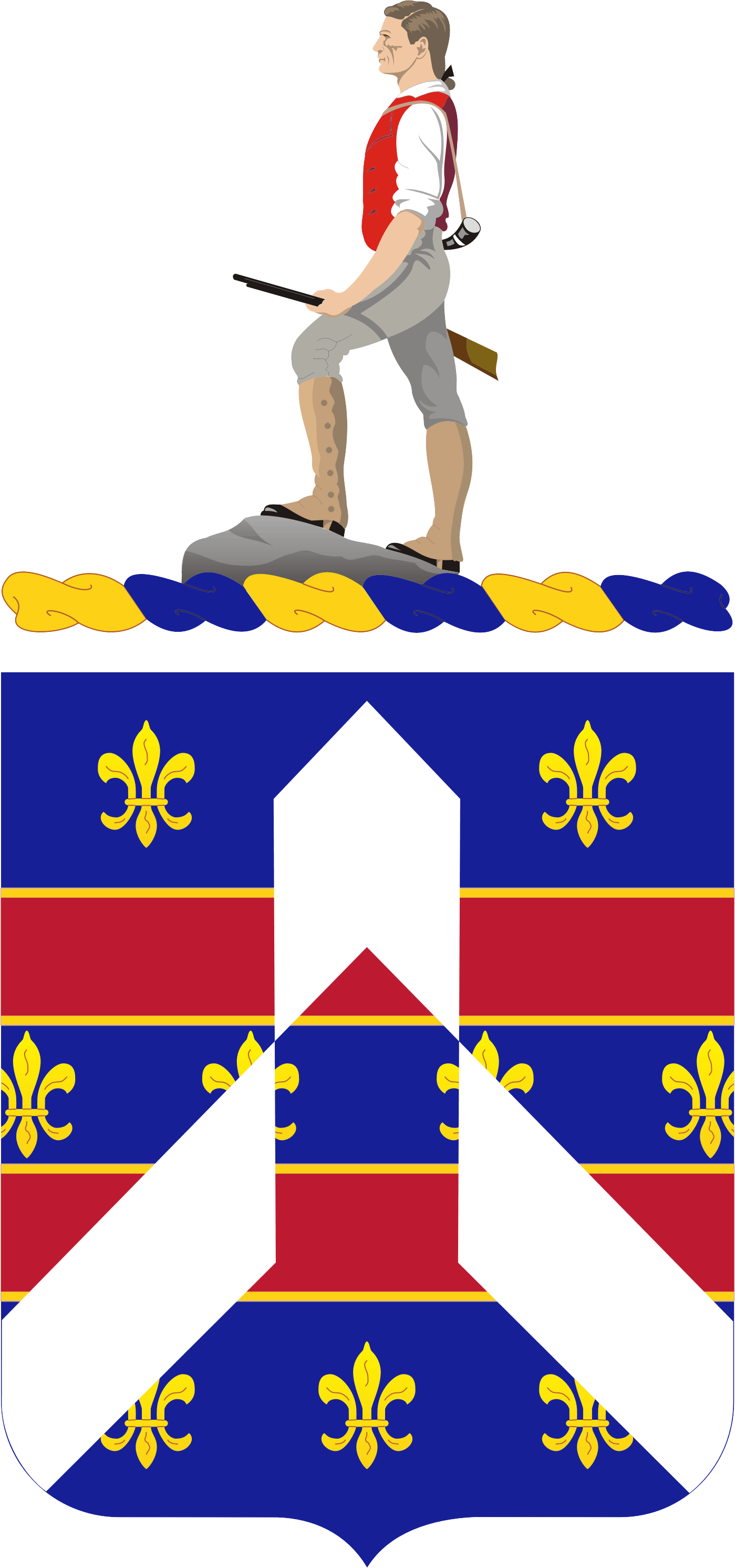
320th Infantry
"Forward"

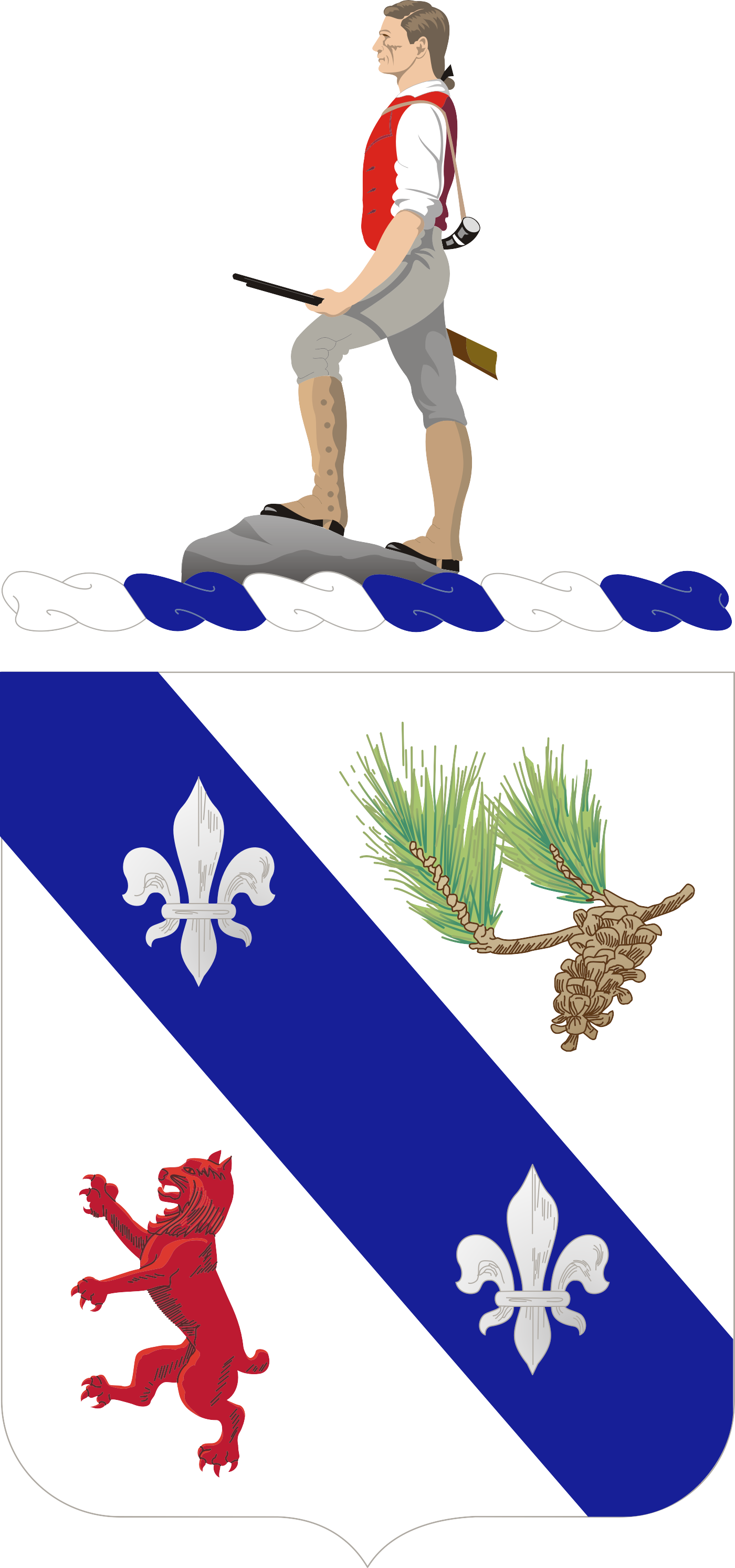
321st Infantry
"En avant" (Forward)

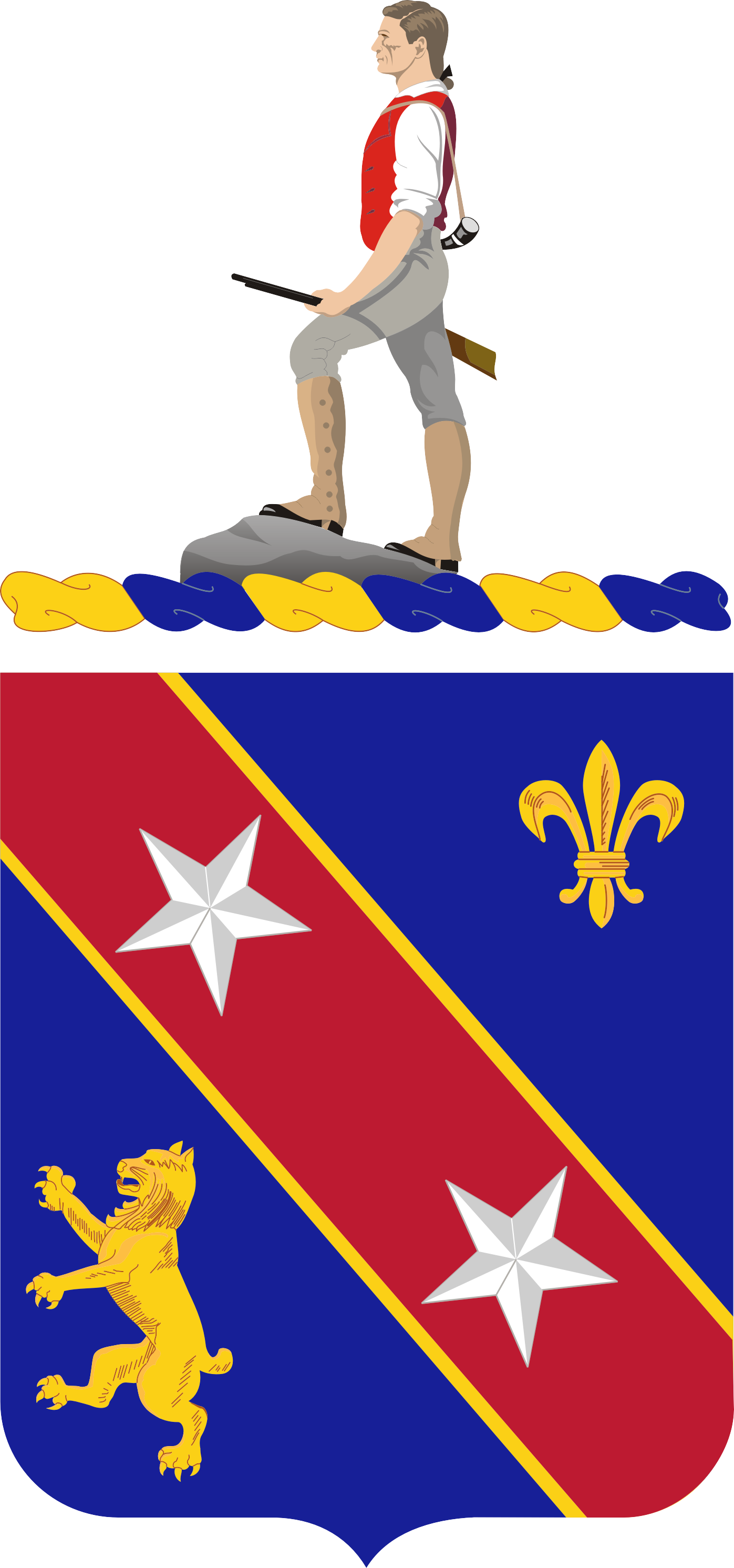
322nd Infantry
"Excelsior" (Still Higher)

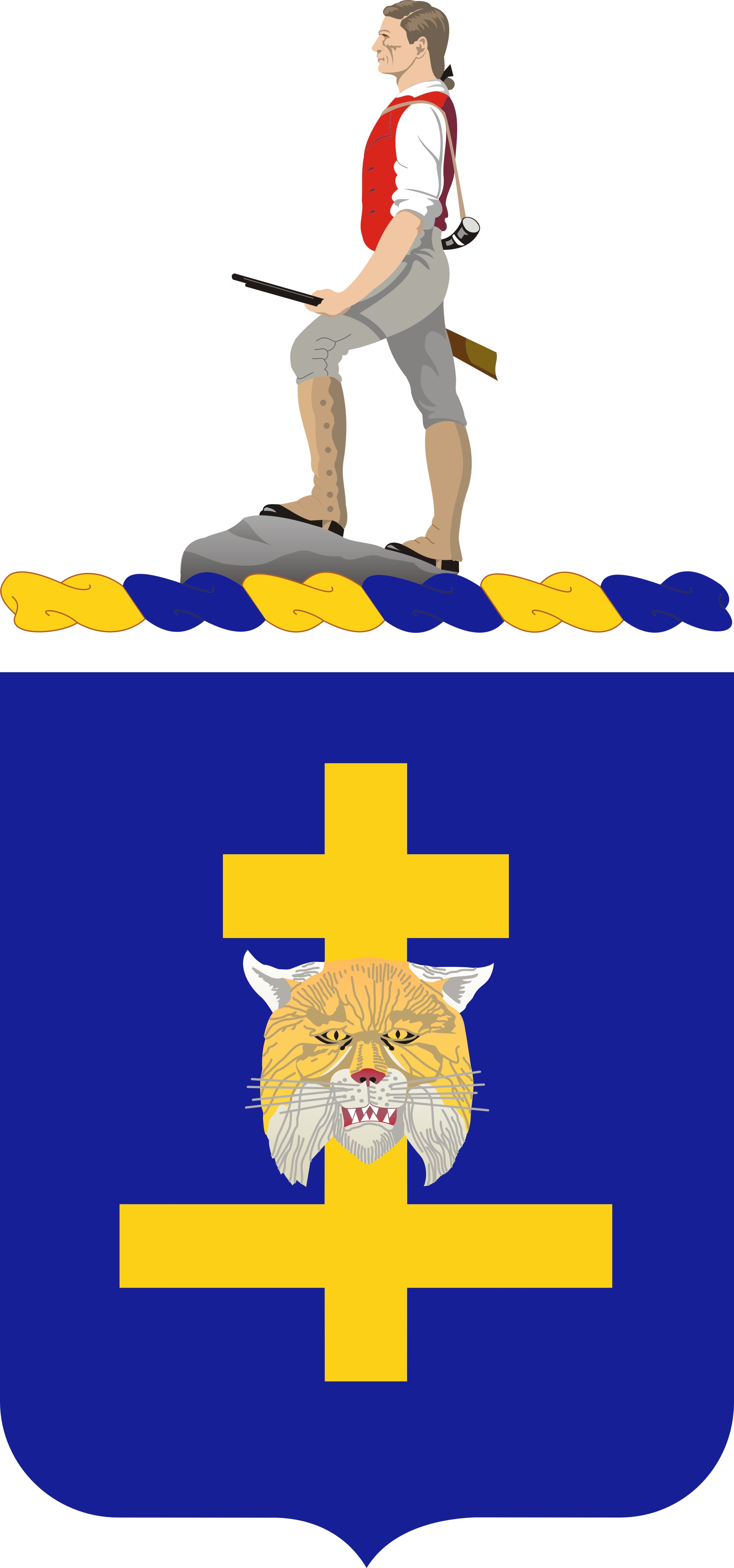
323rd Infantry
"Le bon vouloir servir le pays" (The Good Will to Serve the Country)

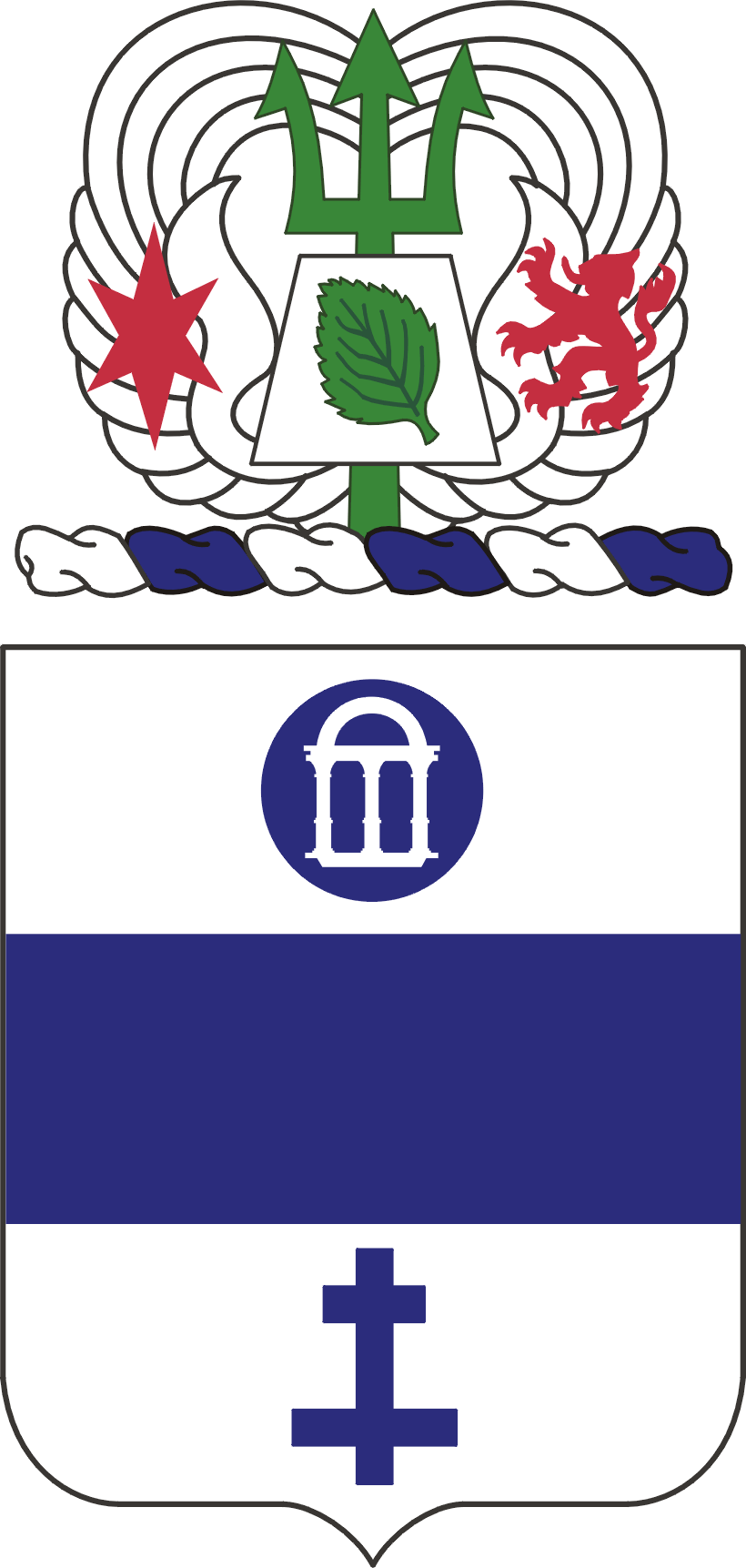
325th Infantry
"Let's Go"
"The Falcons"

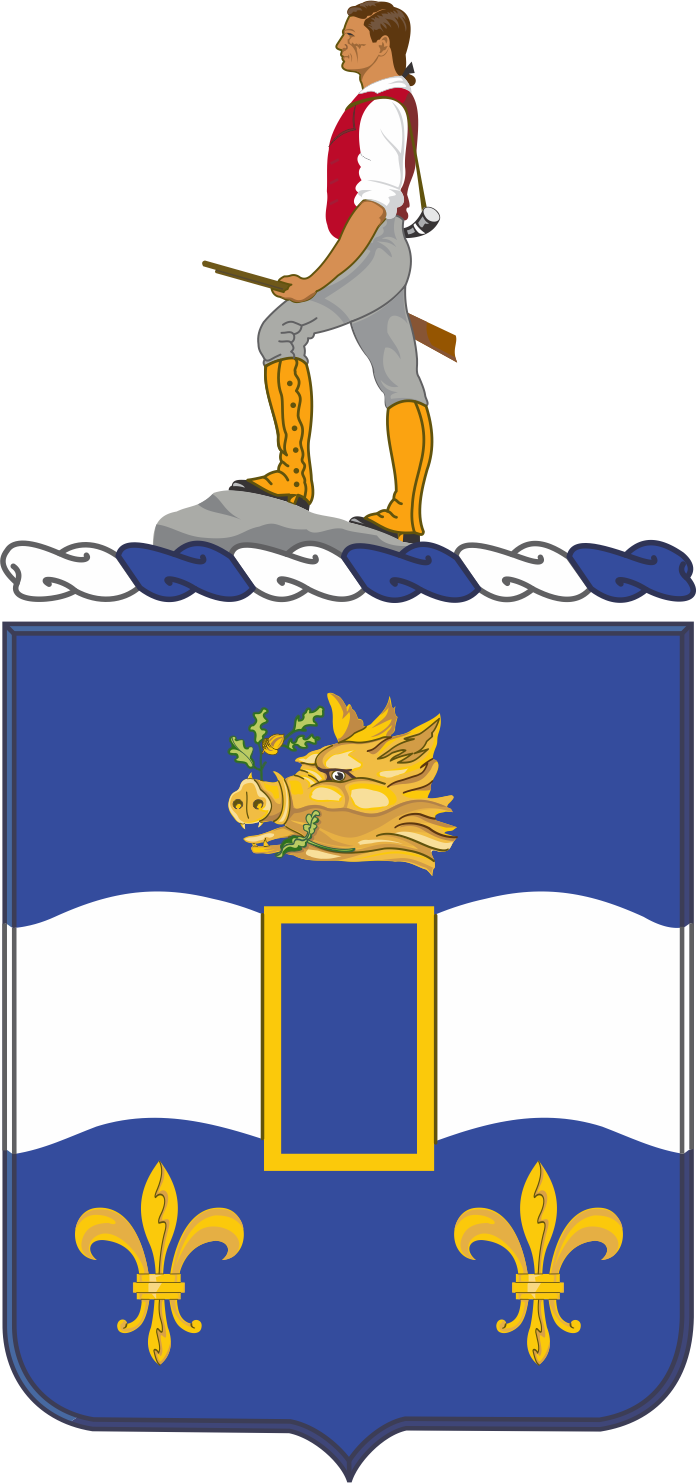
326th Infantry
"Aspera Juvant" (Difficulties Delight)

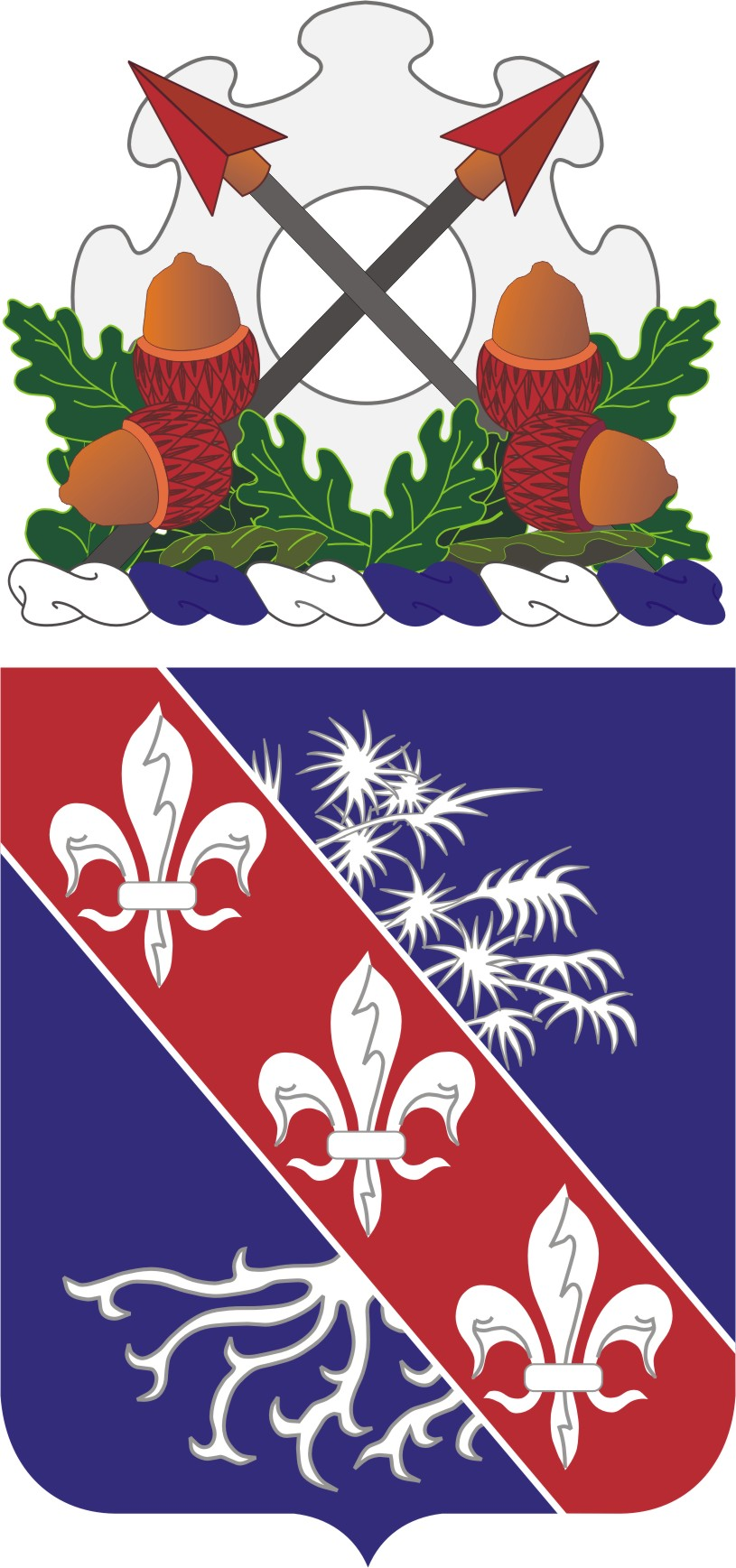
327th Infantry
(formerly 516th Airborne Infantry (less crest))
"Honor and Country"
"The Bastogne Bulldogs"

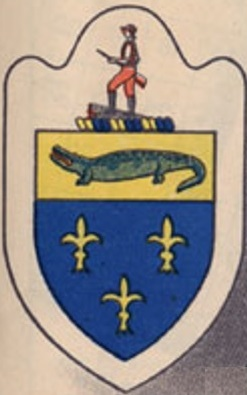
328th Infantry

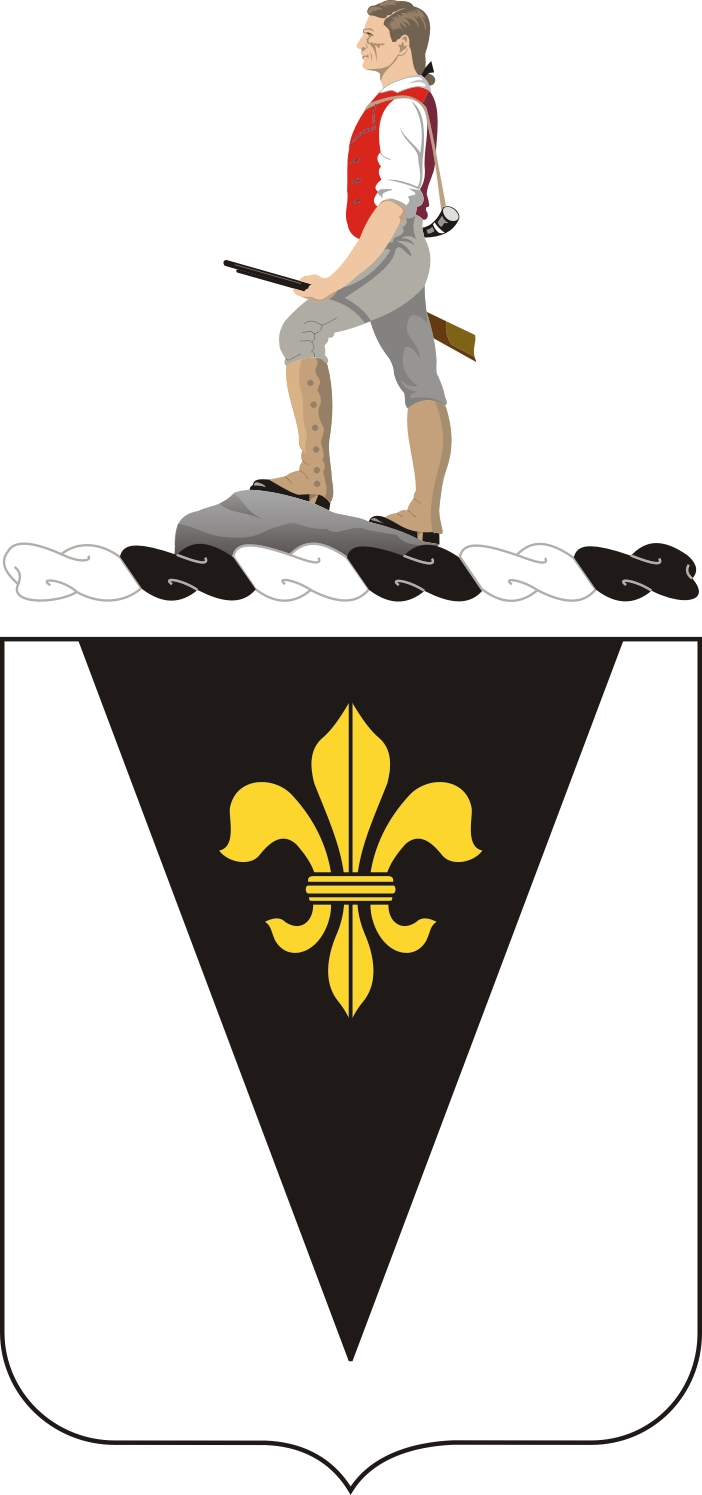
329th Infantry
"Nous gardons" (We Guard)

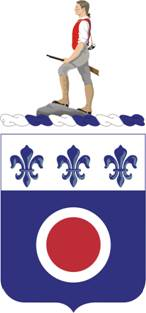
330th Infantry
"Verus Ad Finem" (True to the End)

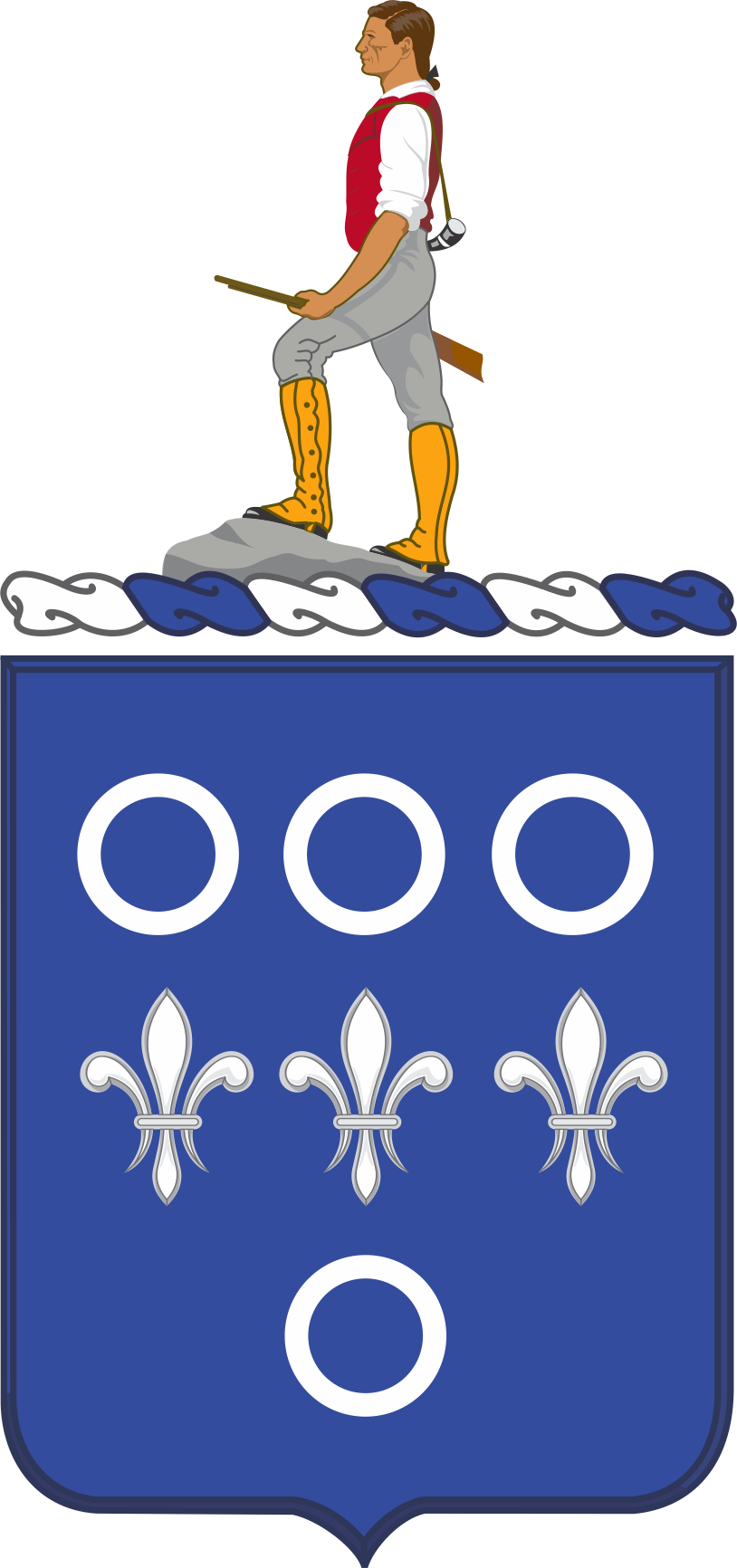
331st Infantry
"see it through"

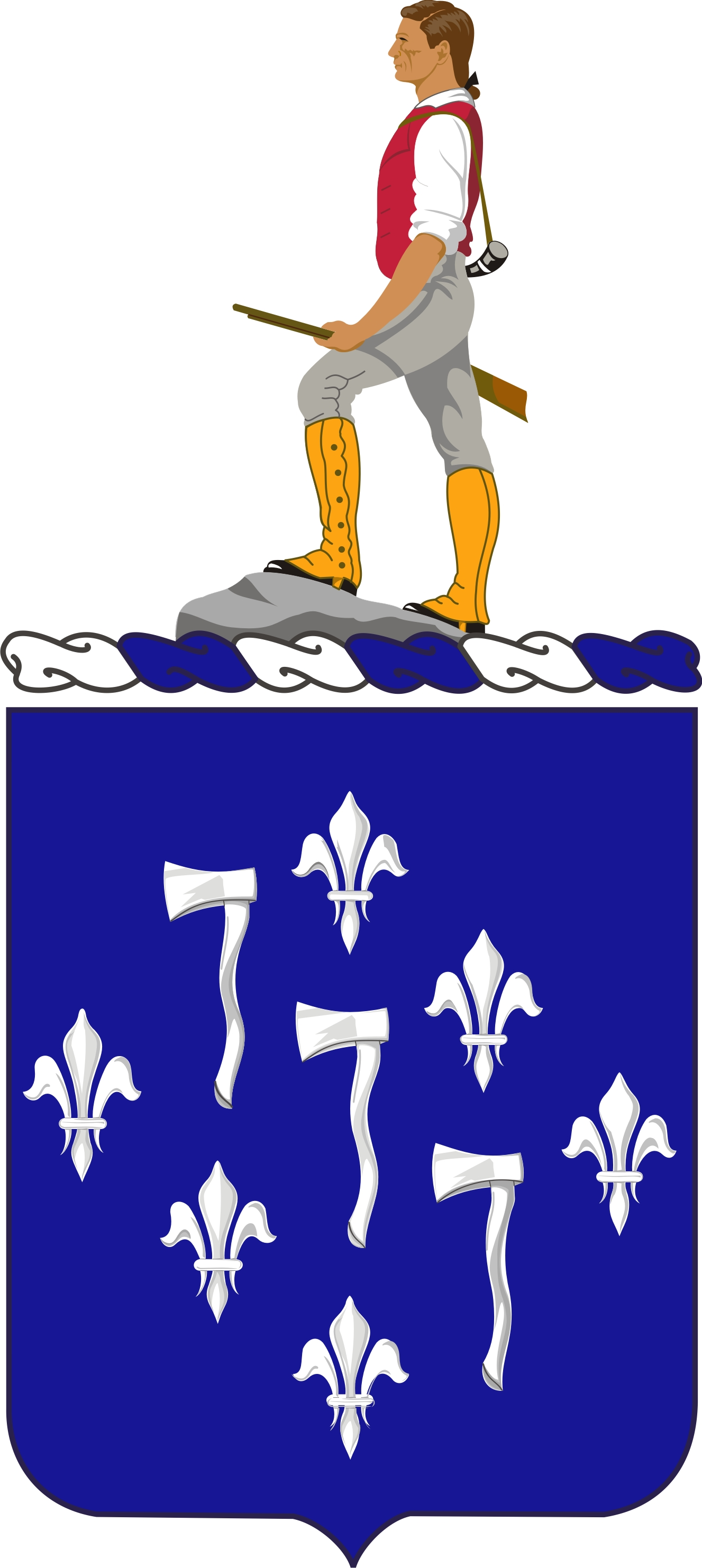
333rd Infantry
"The Citizen in Arms"

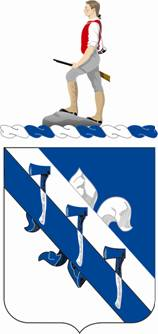
334th Infantry
"Fortes Fortuna Juvat" (Fortune Favors the Brave)

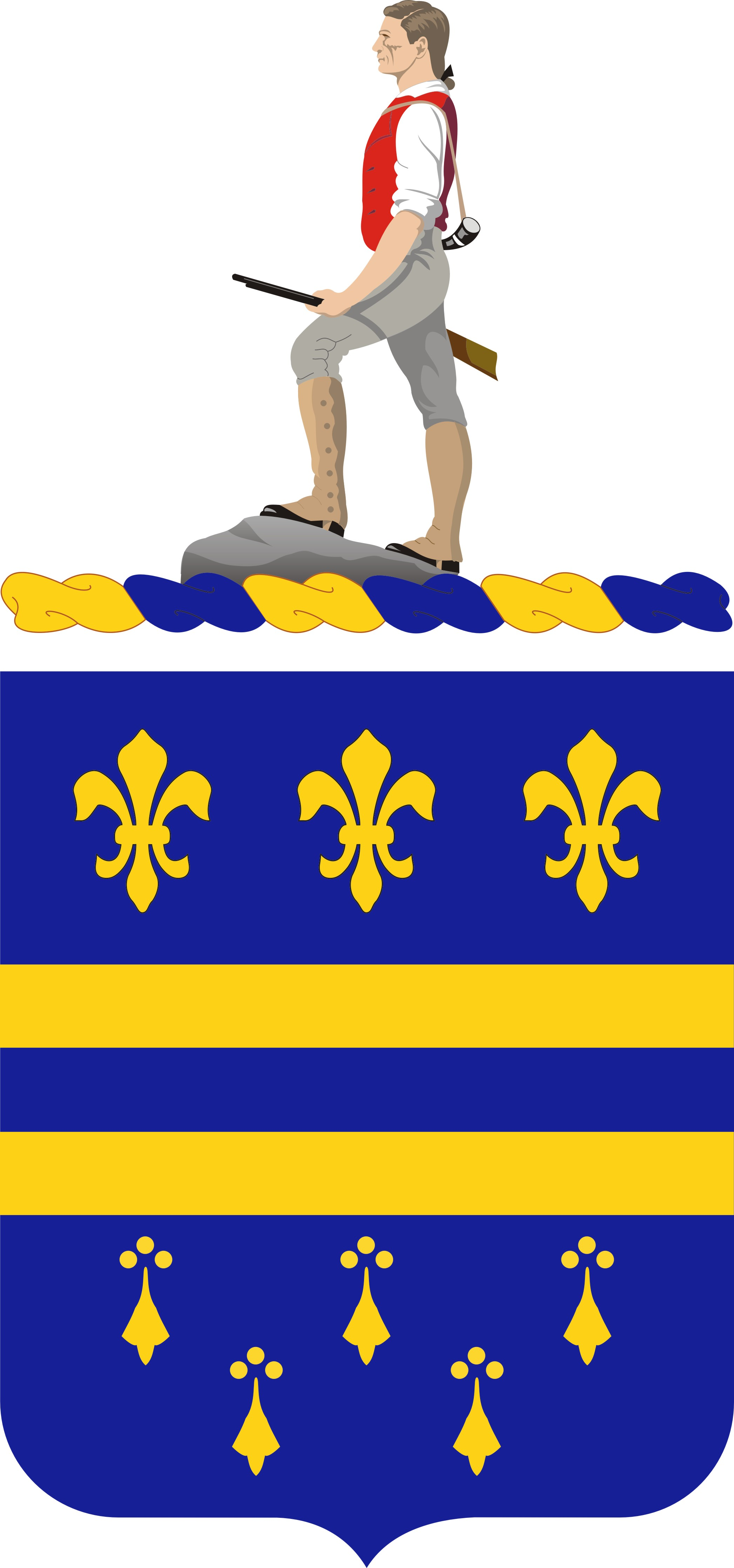
335th Infantry
"A Fin" (To The End)

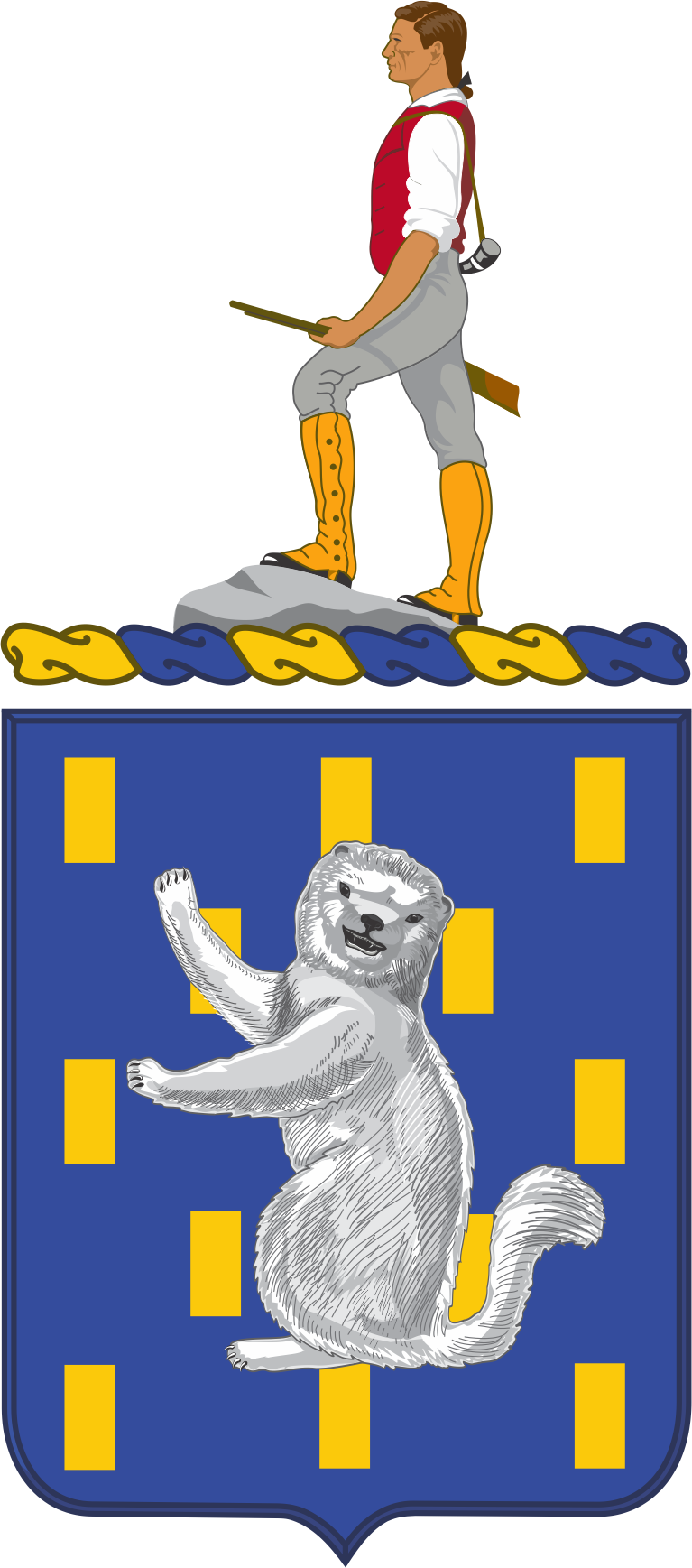
337th Infantry
"Vis Et Virtus (Strength and Courage)

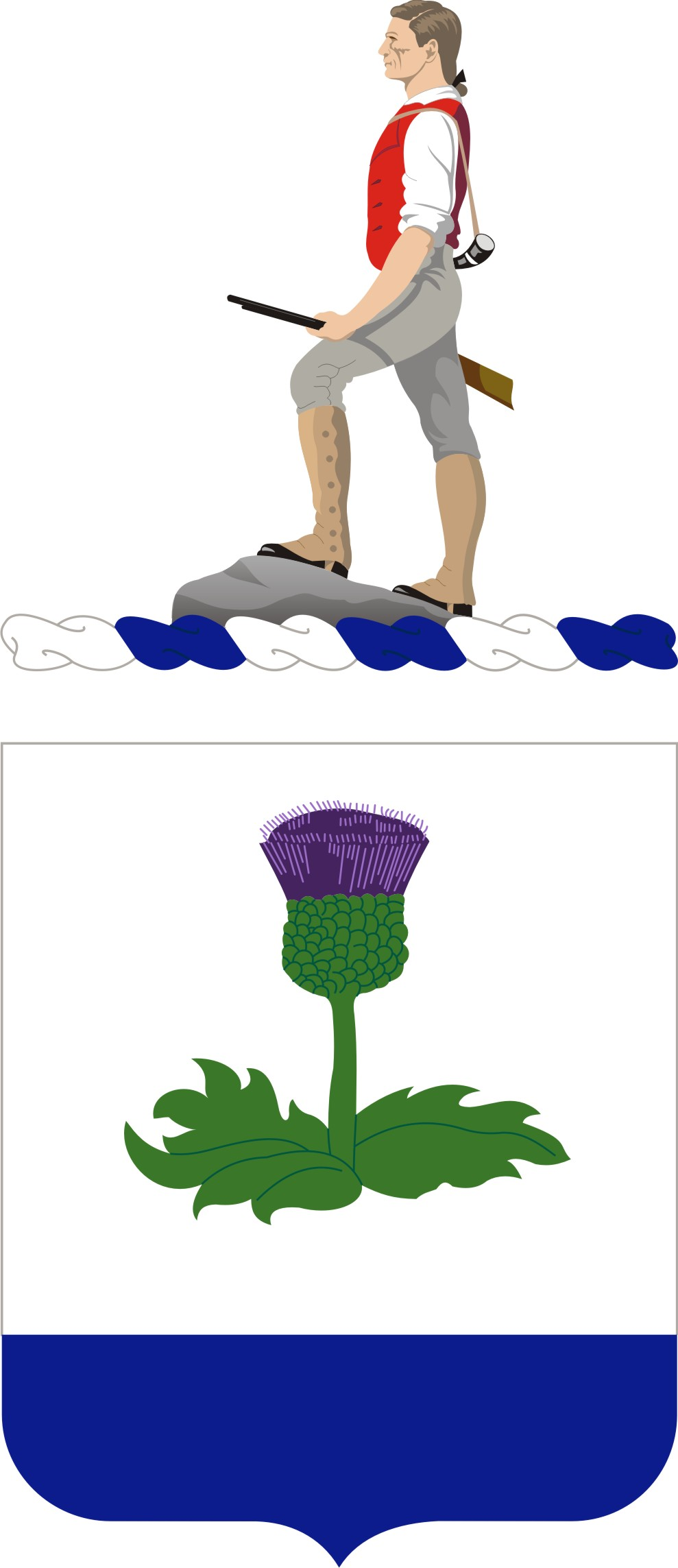
338th Infantry
"Marchons" (March On)

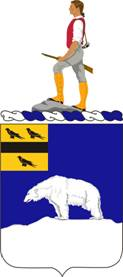
339th Infantry
(now 339th Regiment) "Shtuk Rushaiet" (Russian: "The Bayonet Decides")

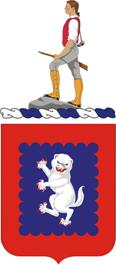
340th Infantry
"Forward"

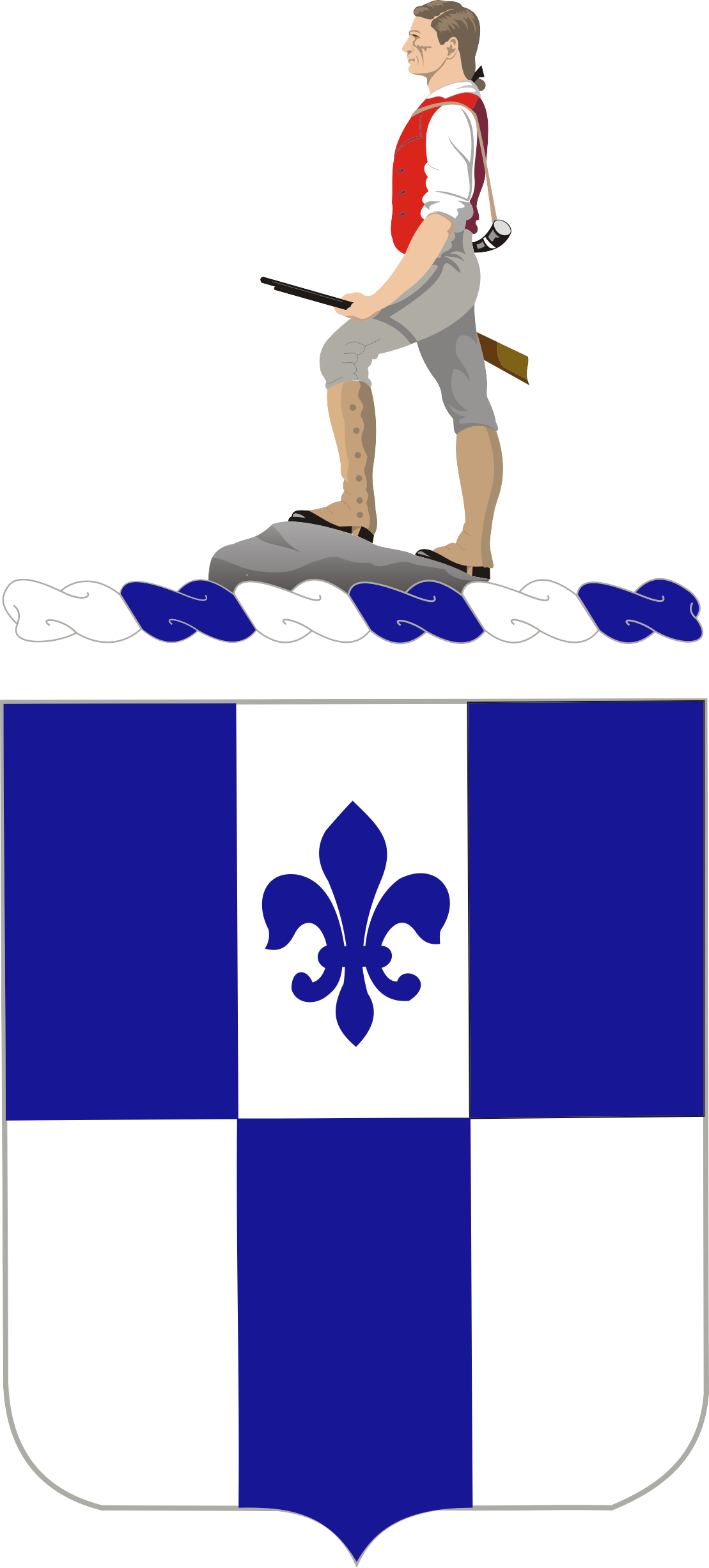
345th Infantry
"Invictus" (Unconquerable)

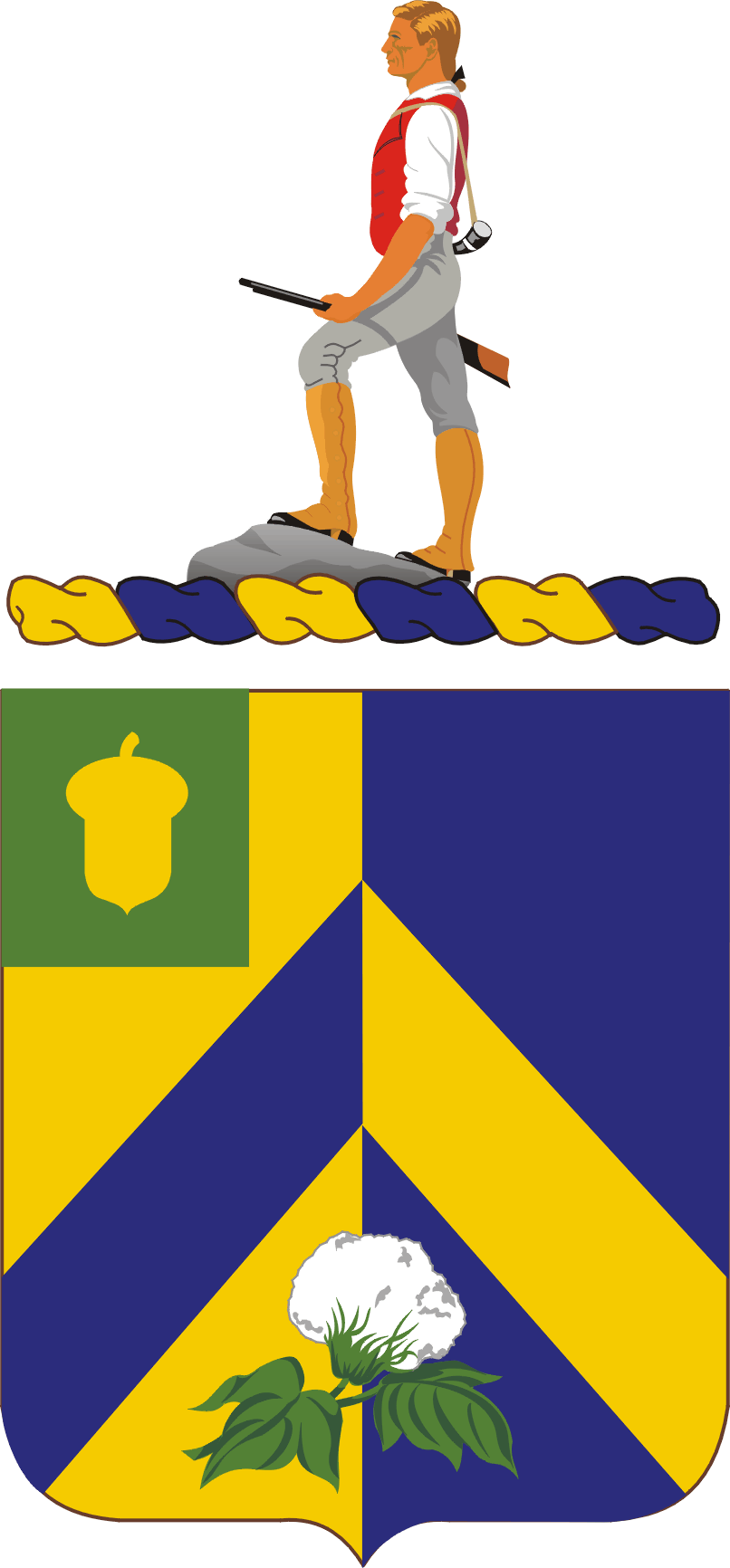
346th Infantry
"Semper Et Ubique Fidelis" (Always and Everywhere Faithful)

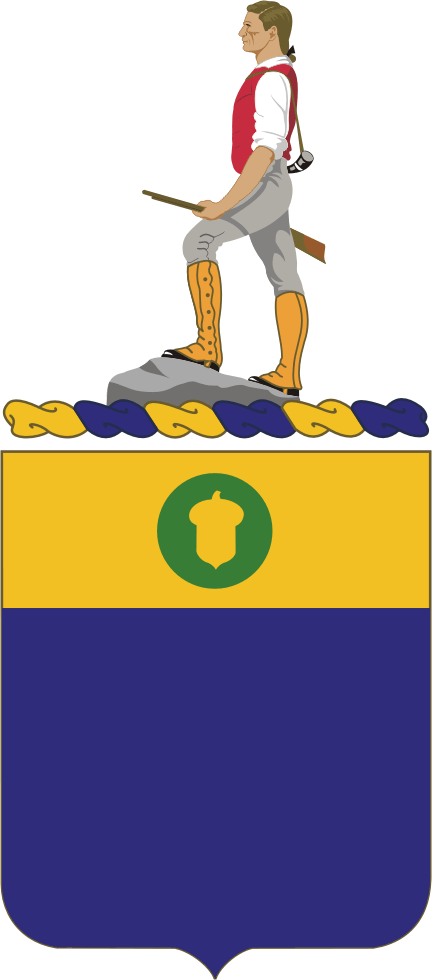
347th Infantry
"Dare Your Best"

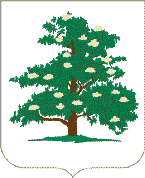
348th Infantry
(now 348th Regiment)
"AnLI yamojmikma KAMASSA" (Sincerity and Strength)

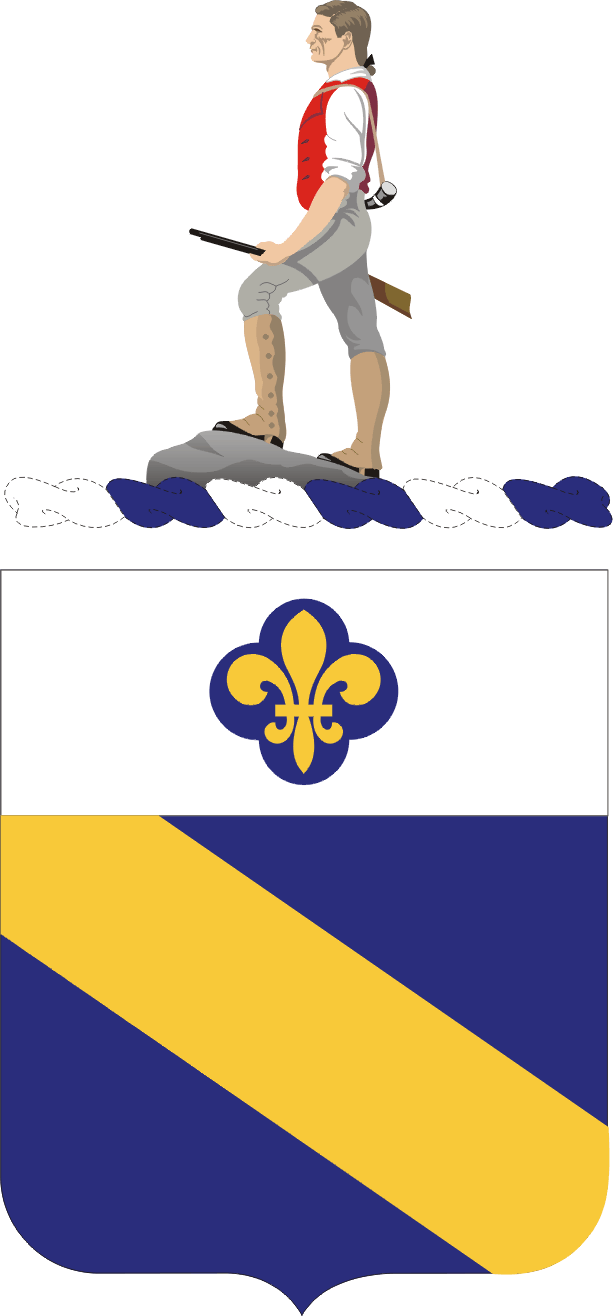
349th Infantry
"Liberty and Rights"

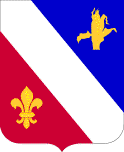
350th Infantry
"Fidelity and service"

351st Infantry
(now 351st Regiment)
"Toujours Prêt" (Always Ready)

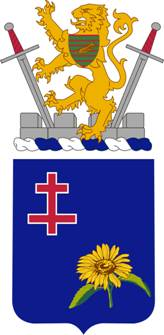
353rd Infantry
(now 353rd Regiment)
"To the Stars Through Difficulties"

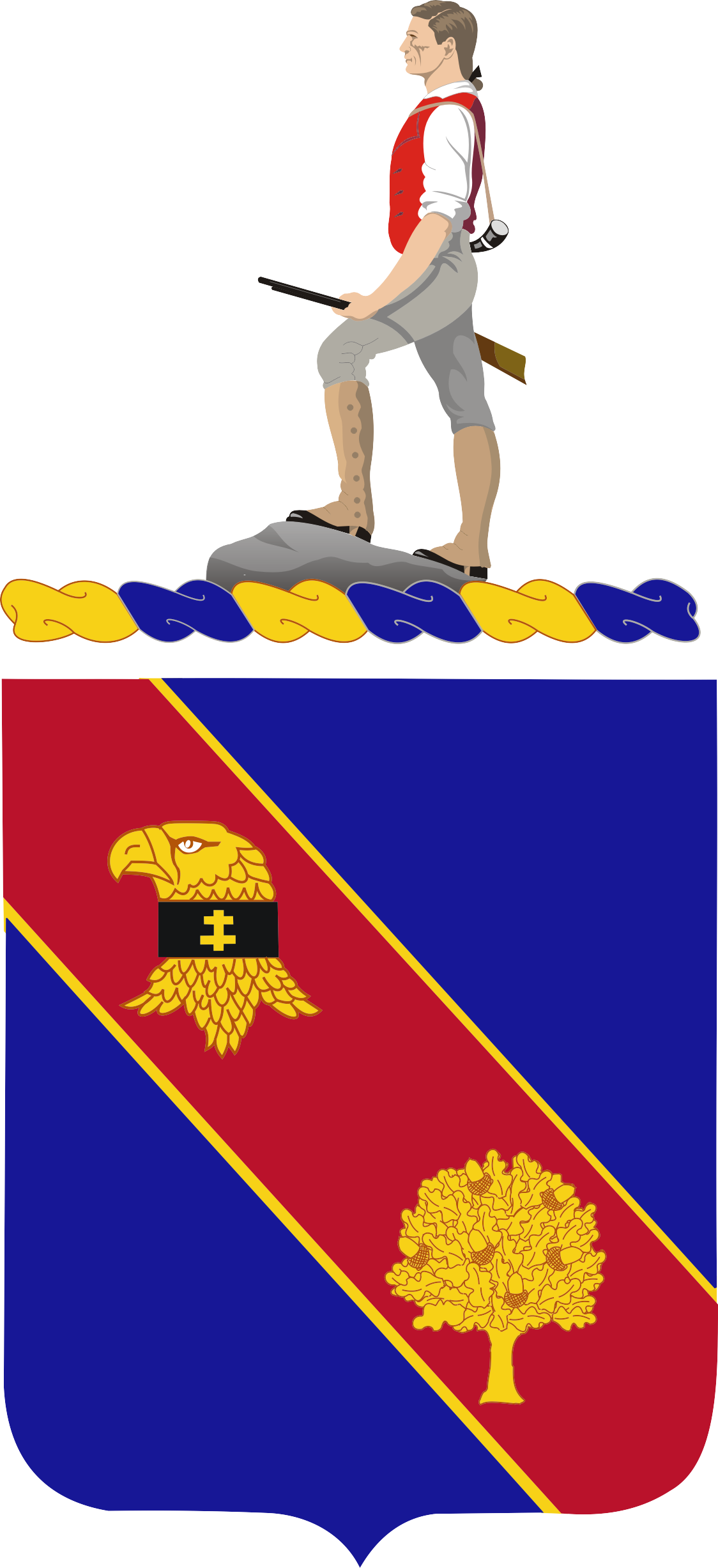
354th Infantry
(now 364th Regiment)
"Wright, Wood, Winn"

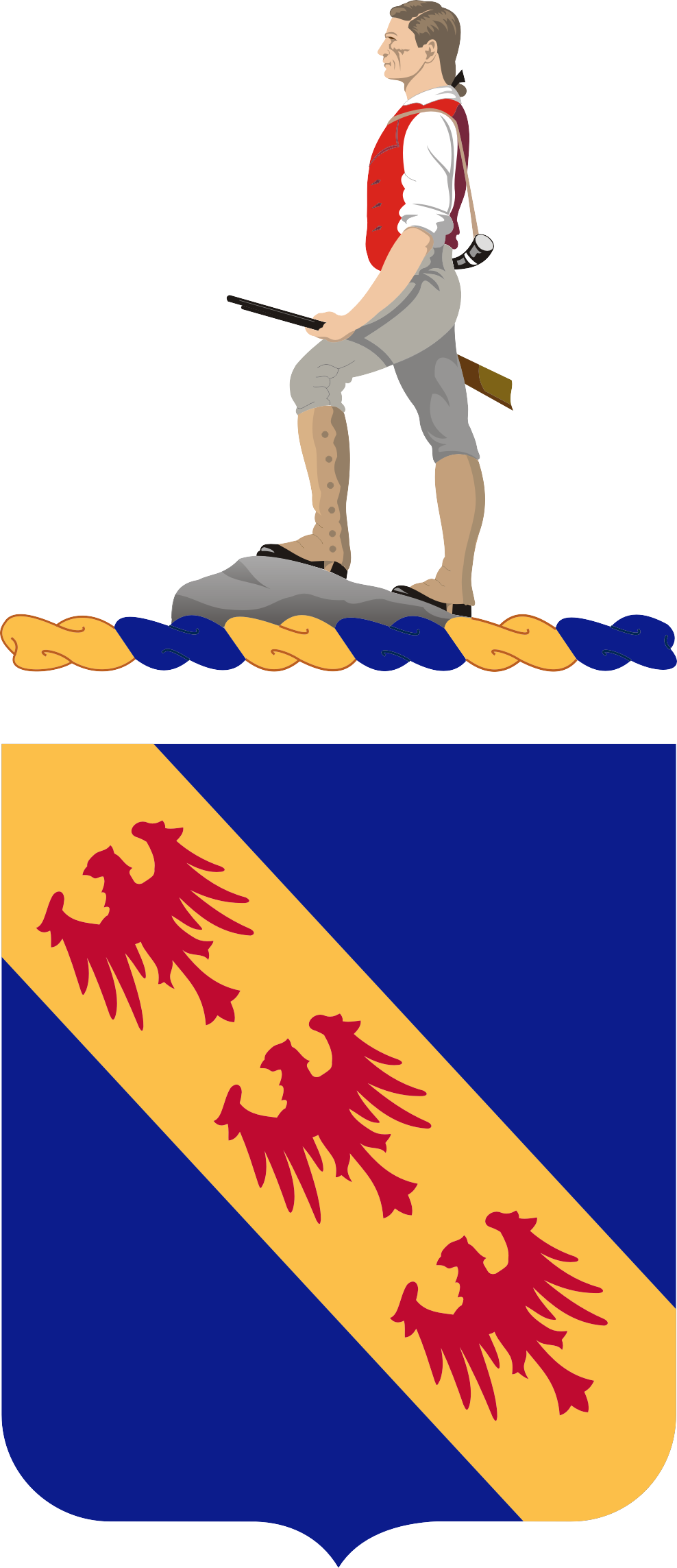
355th Infantry
"Fidem Praestabimus" (We Will Keep the Faith)

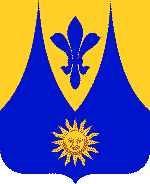
356th Infantry
"Boutze en Avant" (Push Forward)

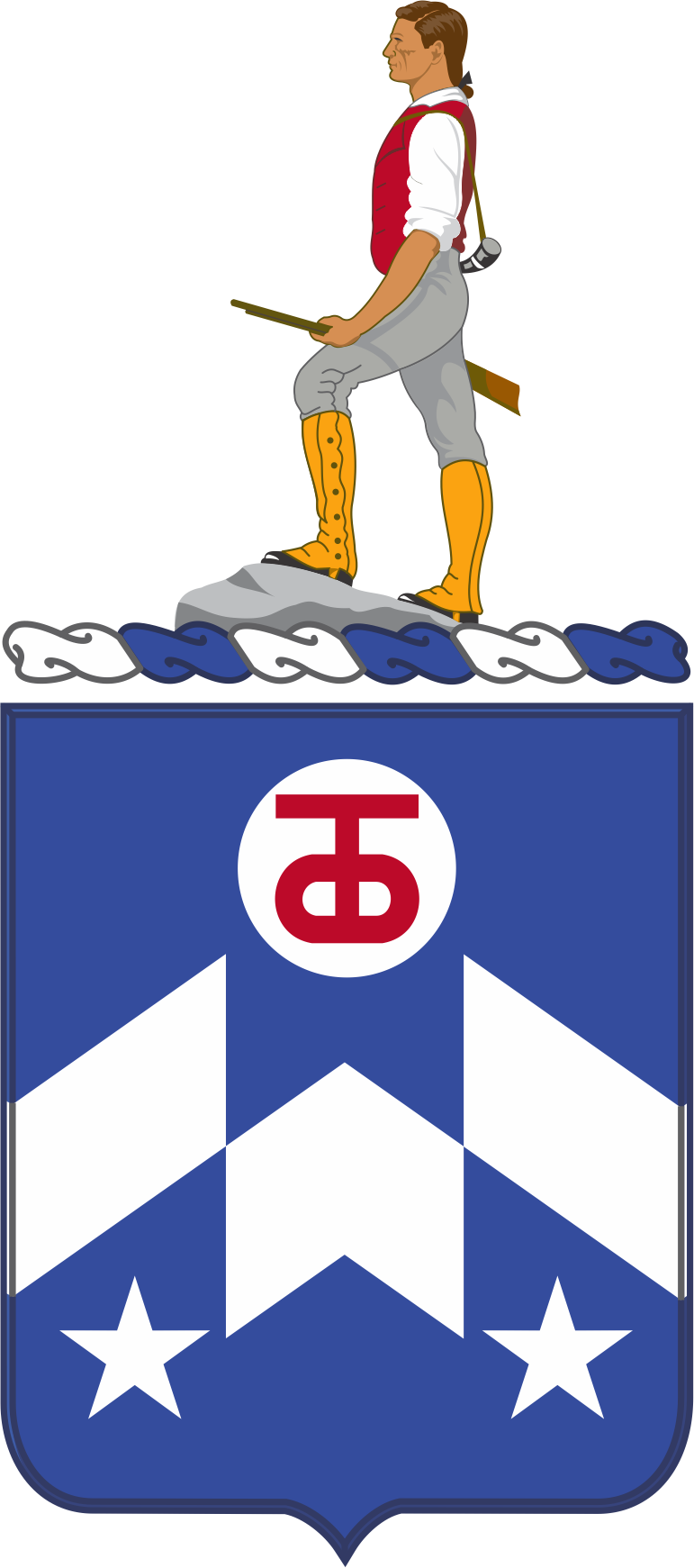
357th Infantry
"Siempre Alerta" (Always on Alert)

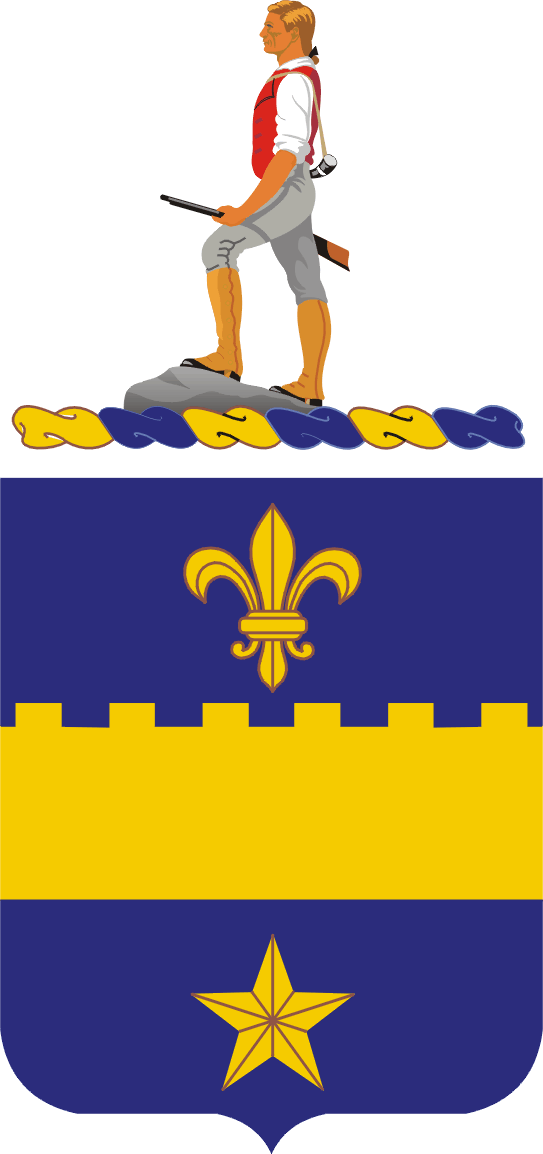
358th Infantry
"Peragimus" (We Accomplish)

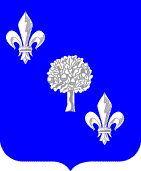
359th Infantry
"Carry on"

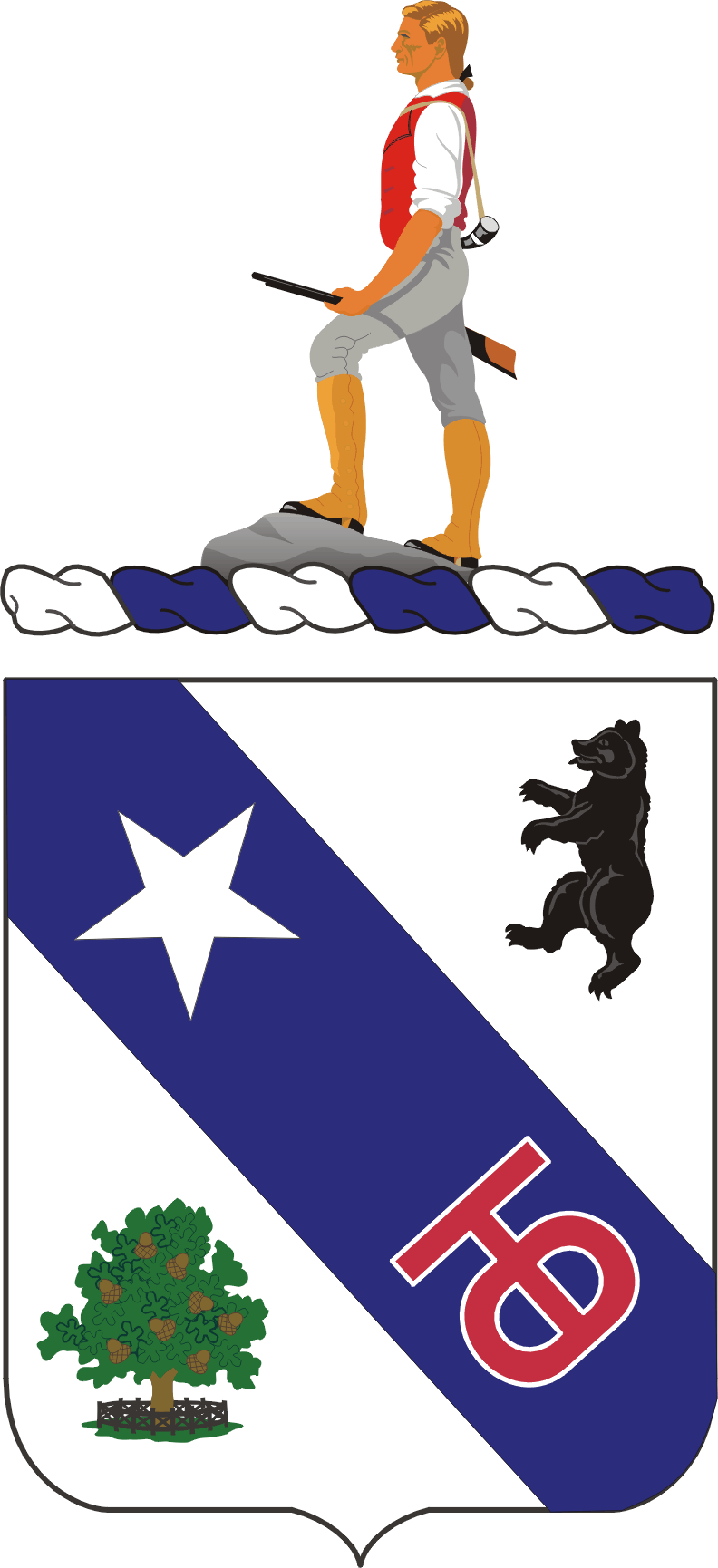
360th Infantry
"Toujours Fidèle" (Always Faithful)

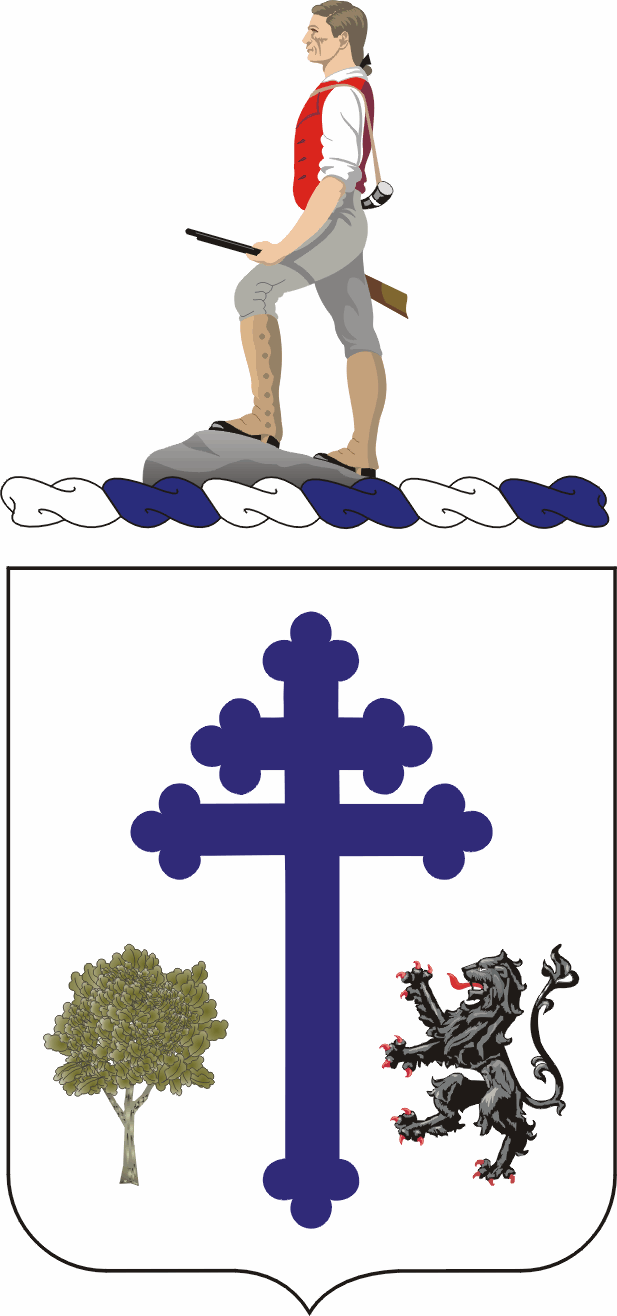
361st Infantry
"Ducit amor patriae" (Led by Love of Country)

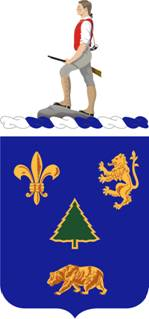
362nd Infantry
"Arma Tuentur Pacem" (Arms Are the Guardian of Peace)

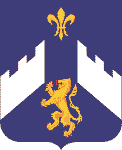
363rd Infantry
(now 363rd Regiment)
"We Do"

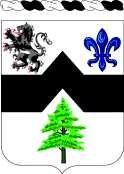
364th Infantry
(now 364th Regiment)
"Semper Paratus" (Always Ready)

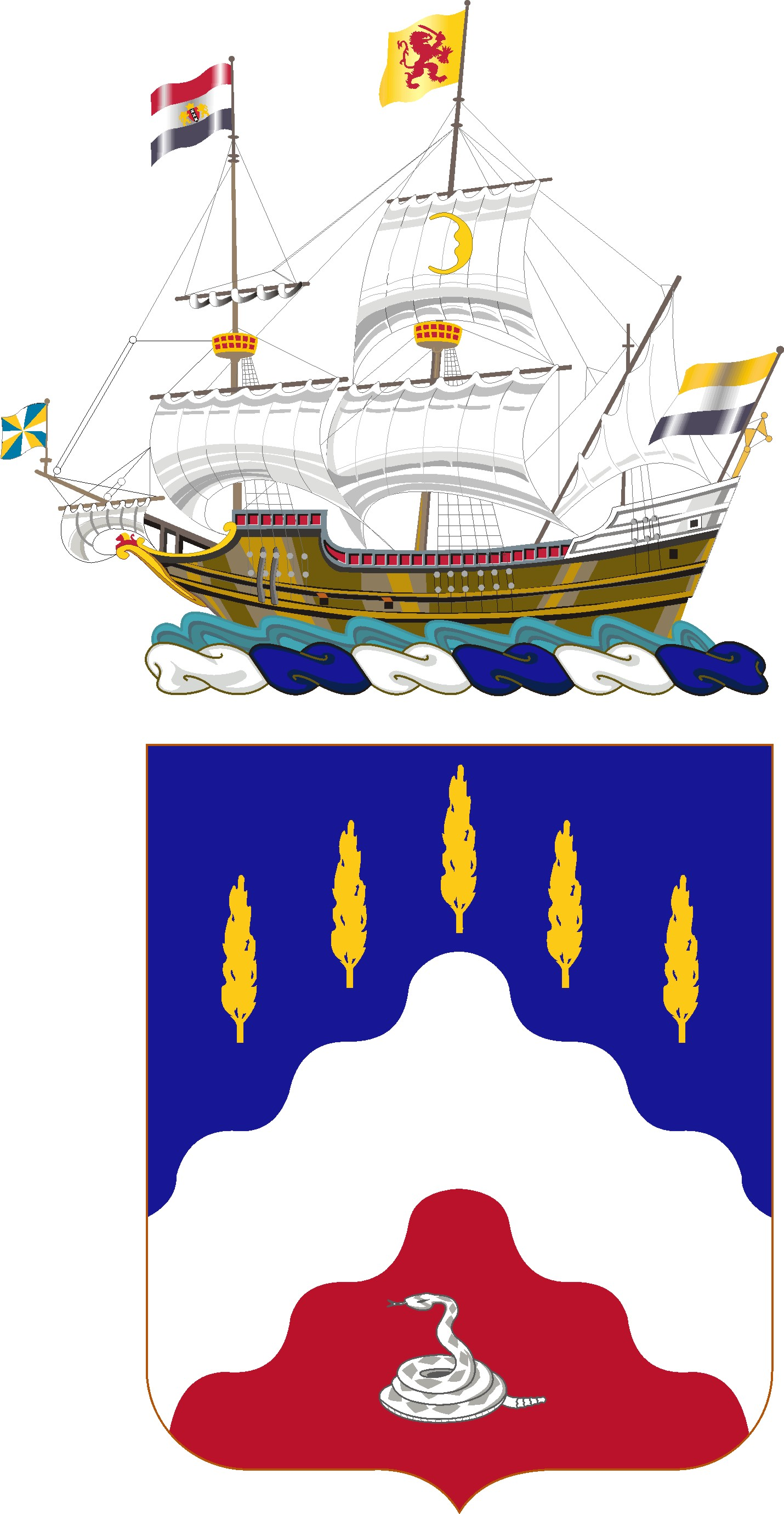
369th Infantry
"Don't Tread on Me"

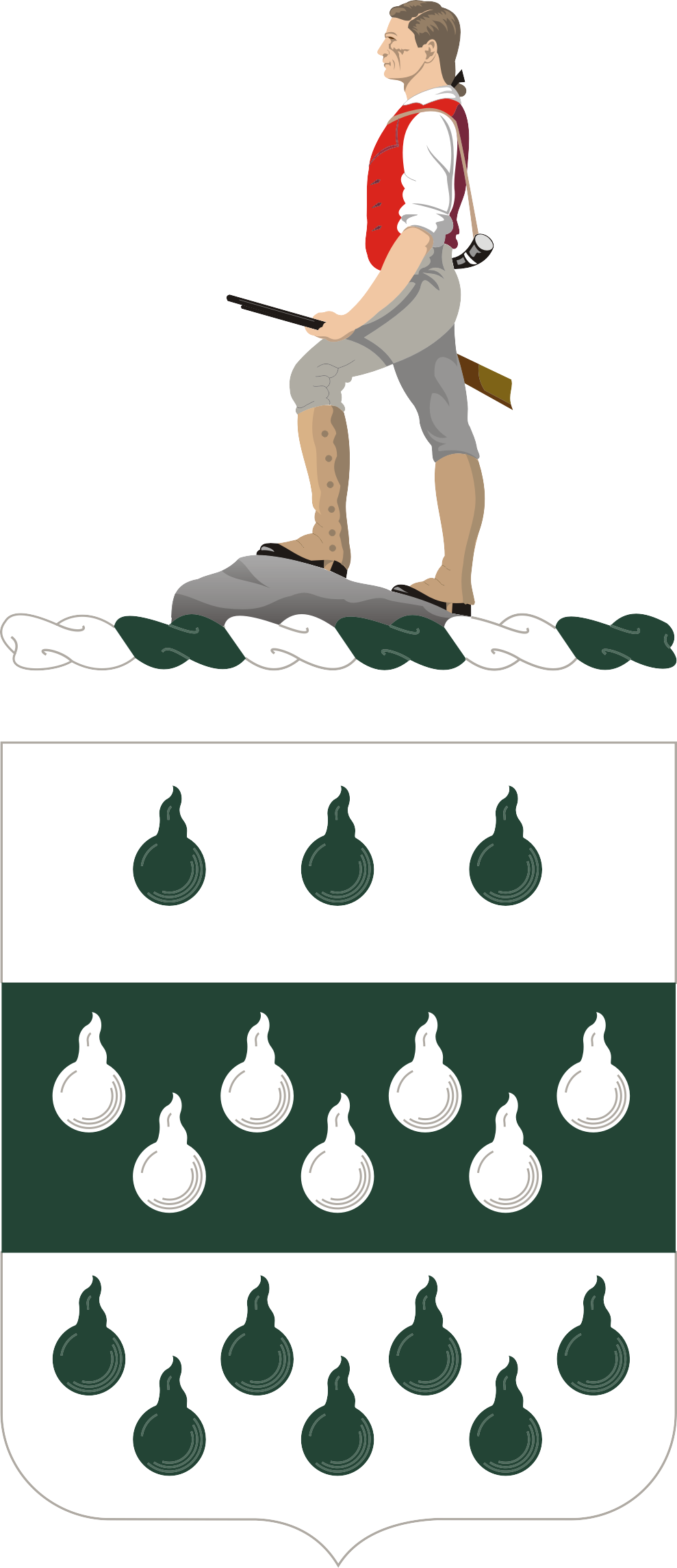
377th Infantry
"NI GA DA E SA SDI" (Onward)

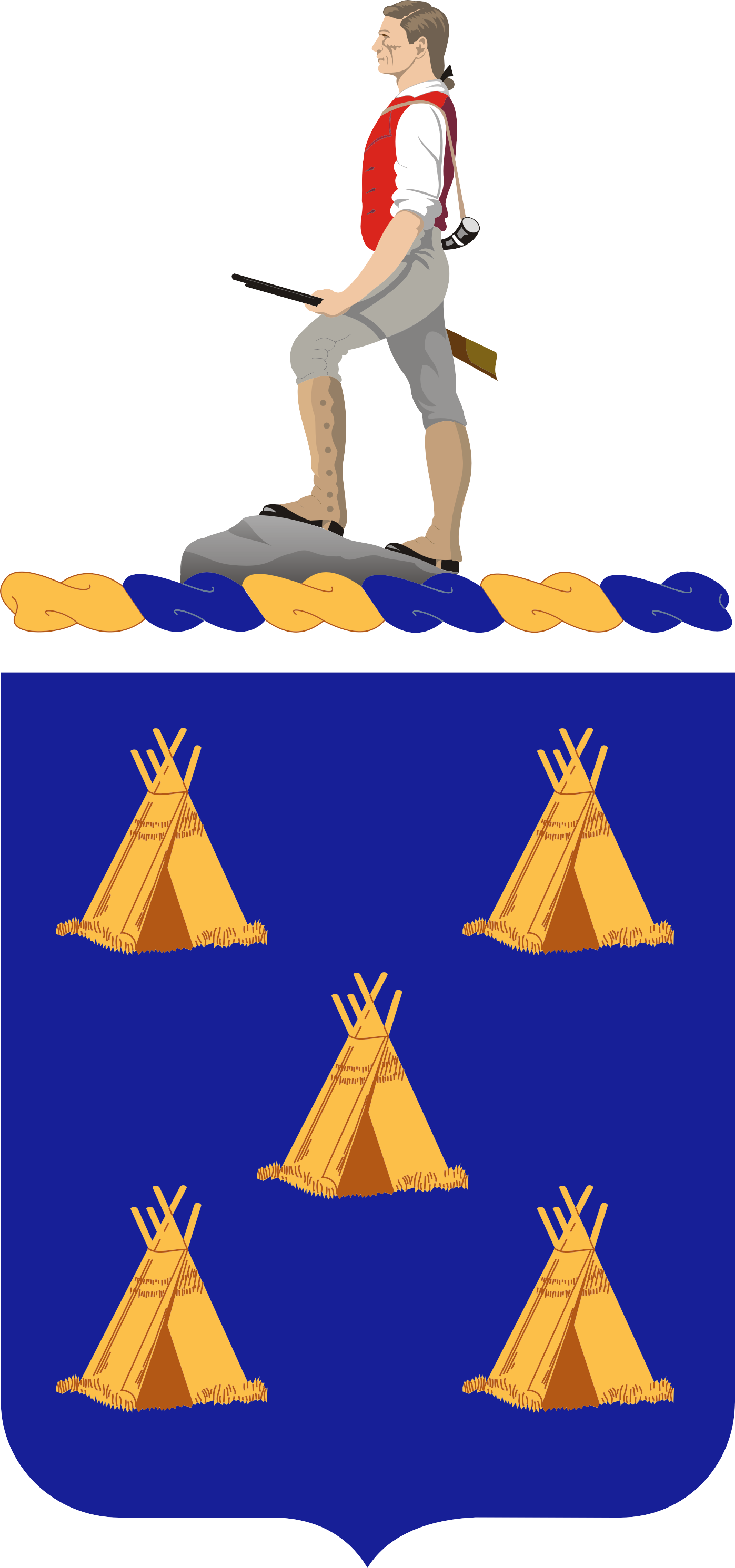
378th Infantry
"Hikia Kallo" (Stand Firm)

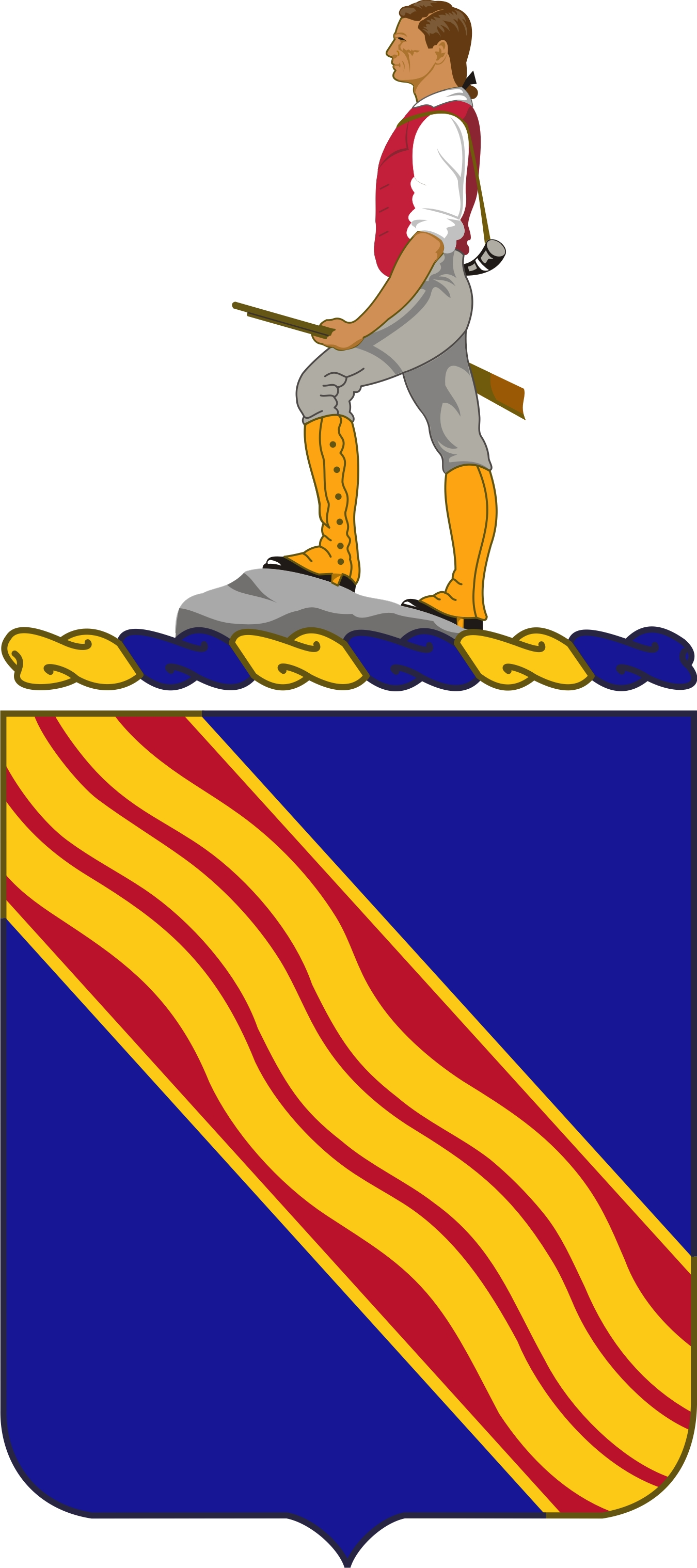
379th Infantry
"Ad finem" (To The End)

381st Infantry
"Paratus et Vigilans" (Ready and Alert)

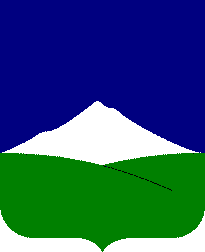
382nd Infantry
"We lead"

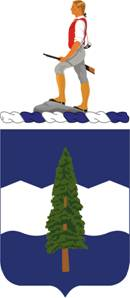
383rd Infantry
"Dependable"

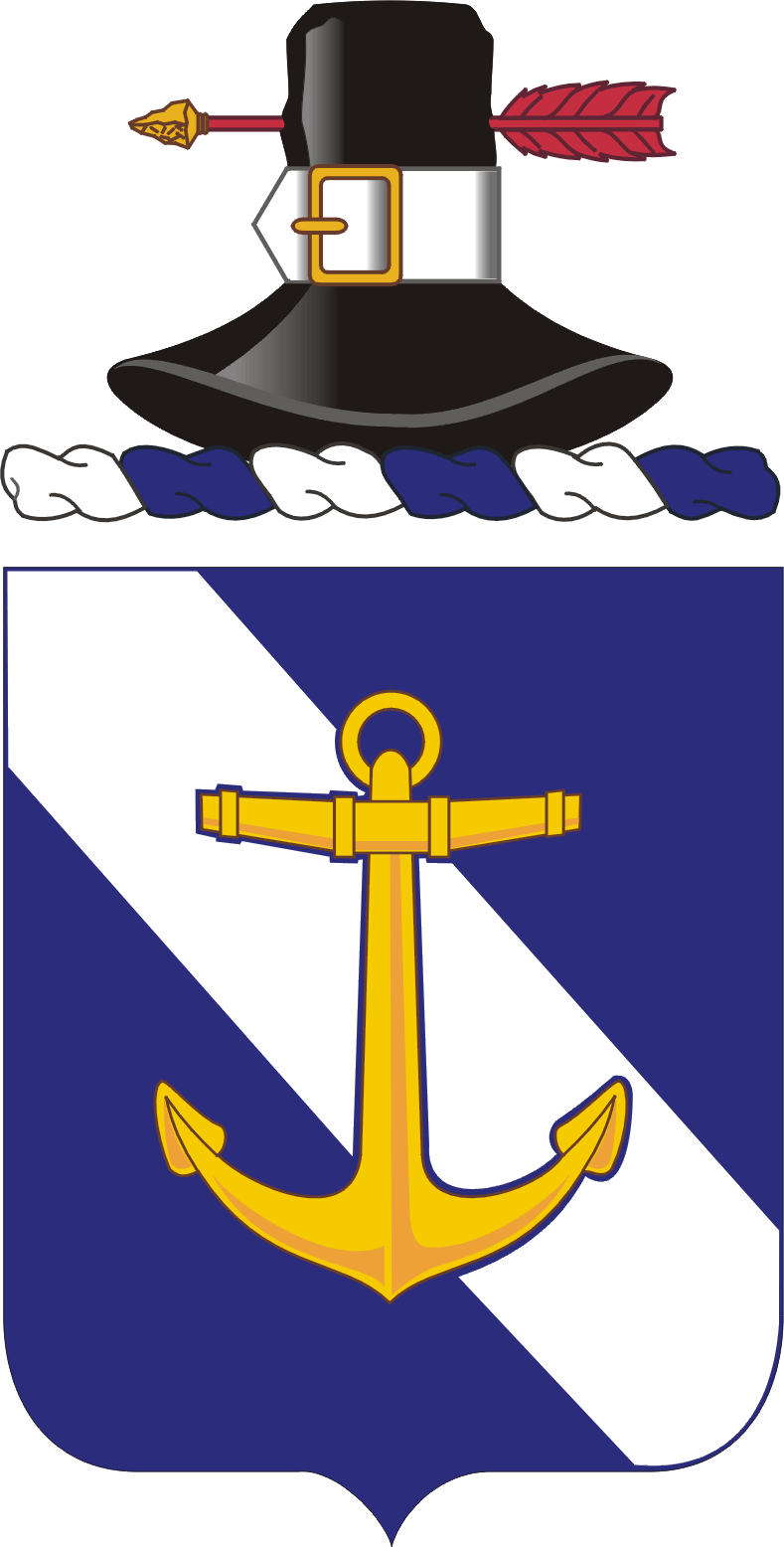
385th Infantry
"Follow Me"

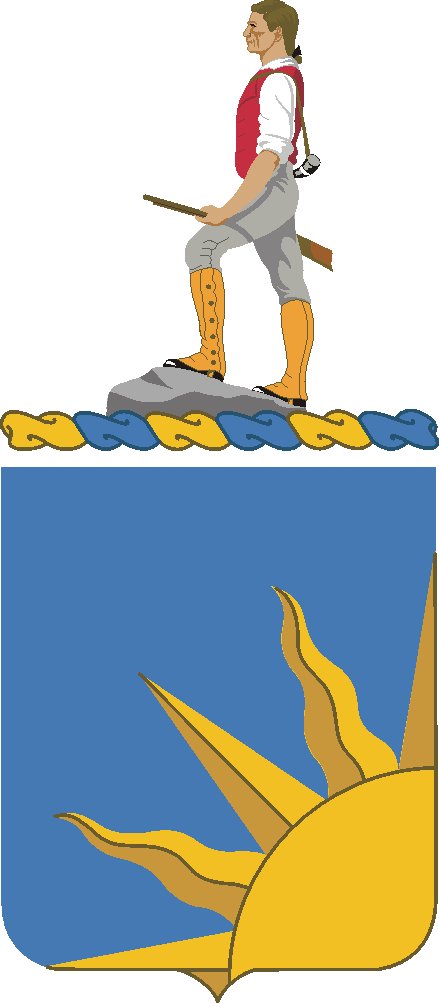
389th Infantry
"We Will Try"

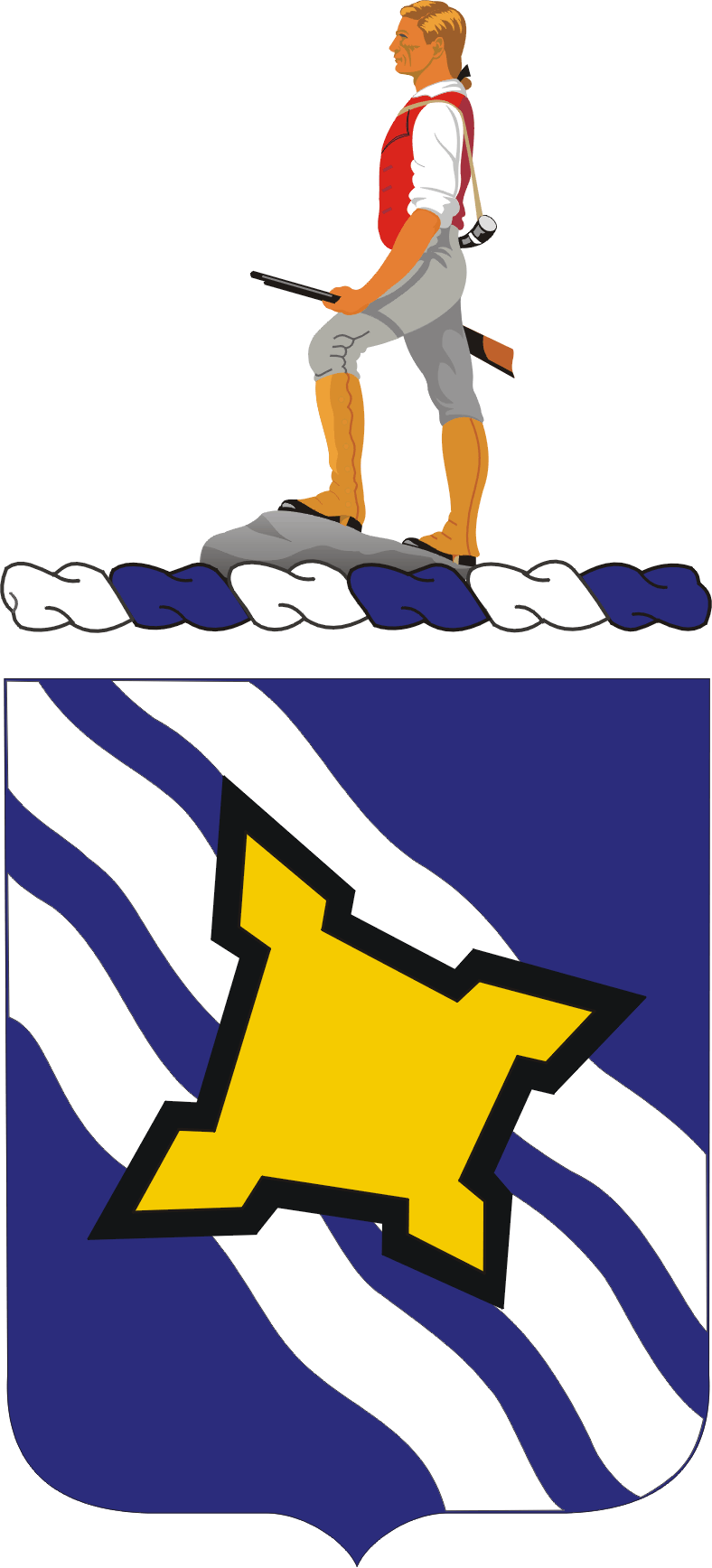
390th Infantry
"KA-YEN-SA-HAH" (Keep The Flag Flying)

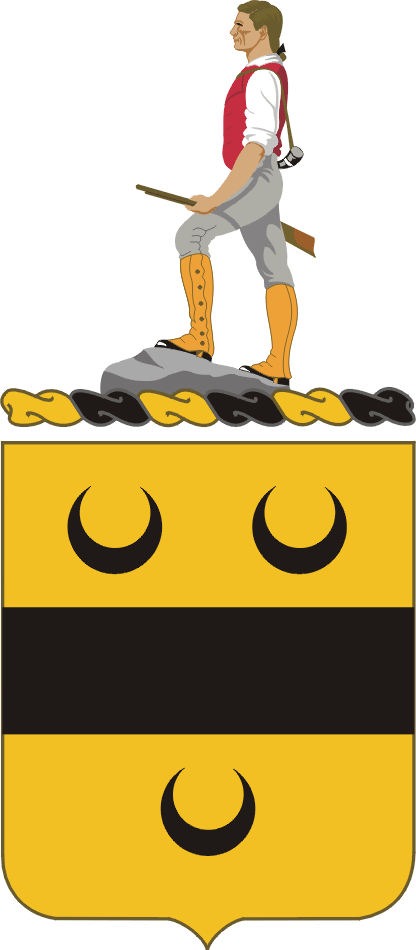
391st Infantry
"We Will Always Win"

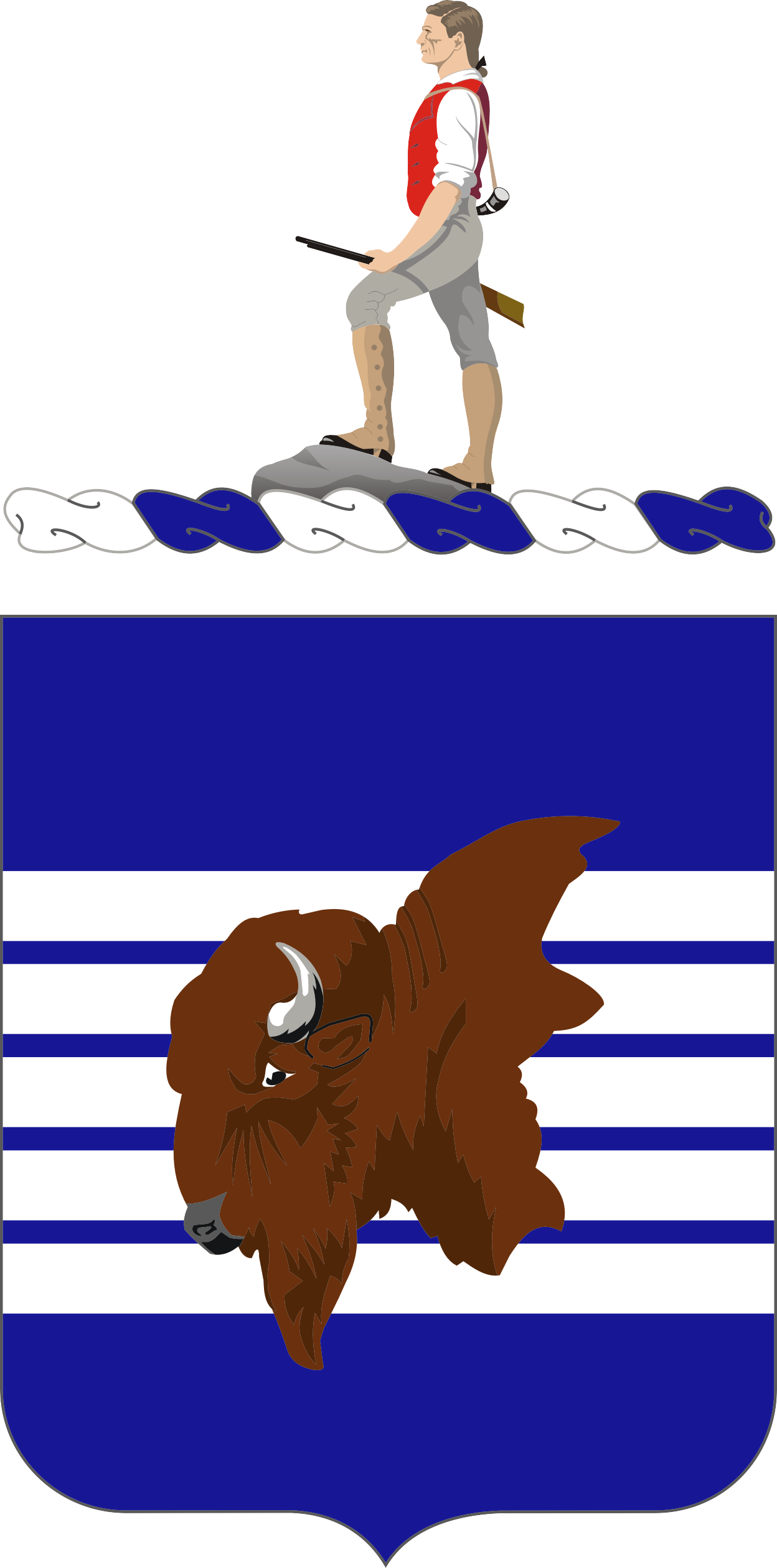
392nd Infantry
"Pace et bello paratus" (Prepared for Peace and War)

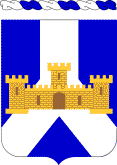
393rd Infantry
(now 393rd Regiment)
"Patriotic Service"

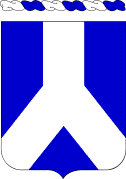
394th Infantry
(now 394th Regiment)
"Audax Et Cautus" (Bold and Wary)

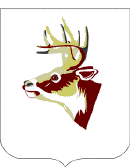
395th Infantry
(now 395th Regiment)
"Vigilans Et Celer" (Vigilant and Swift)

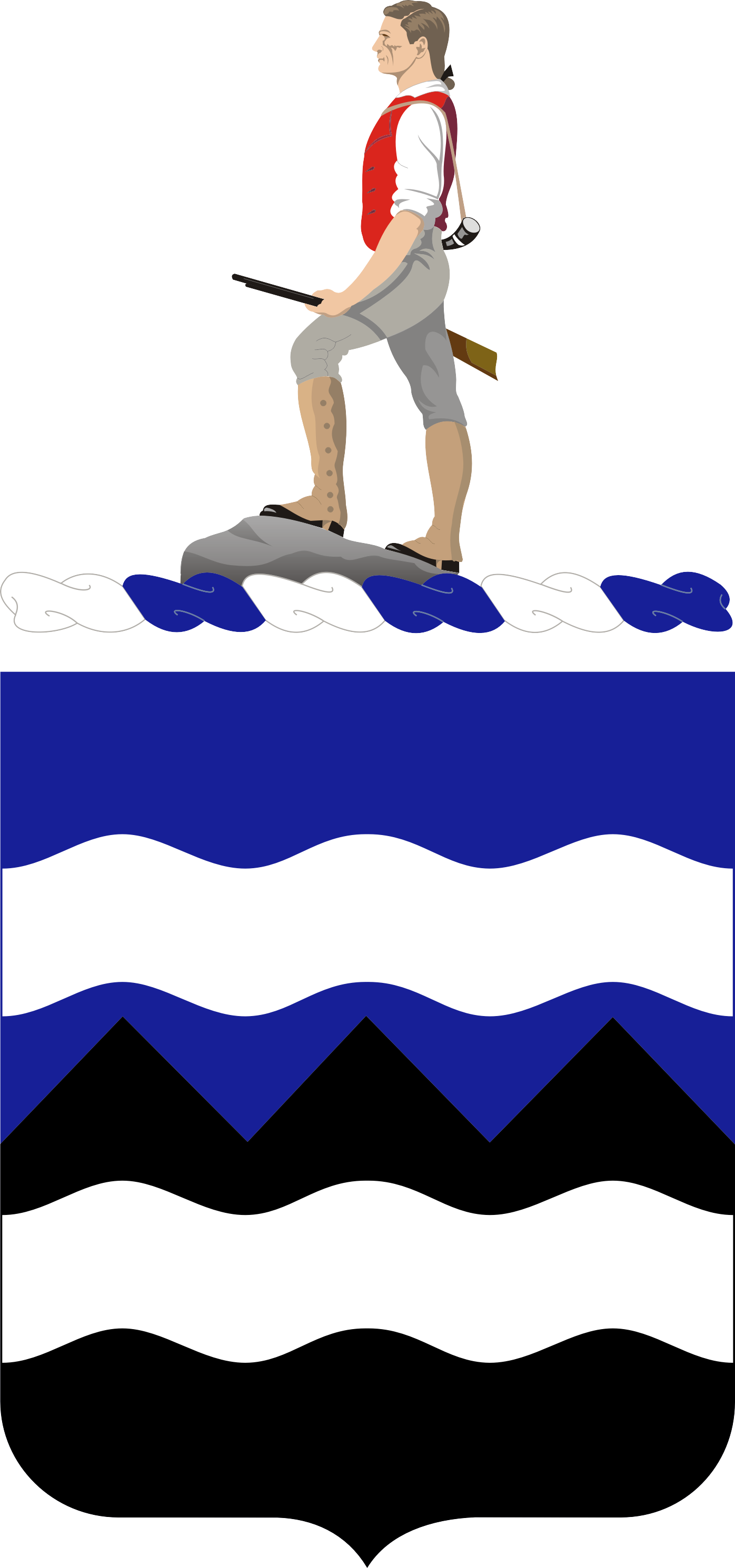
397th Infantry
(now 397th Regiment)
"Death before dishonor"

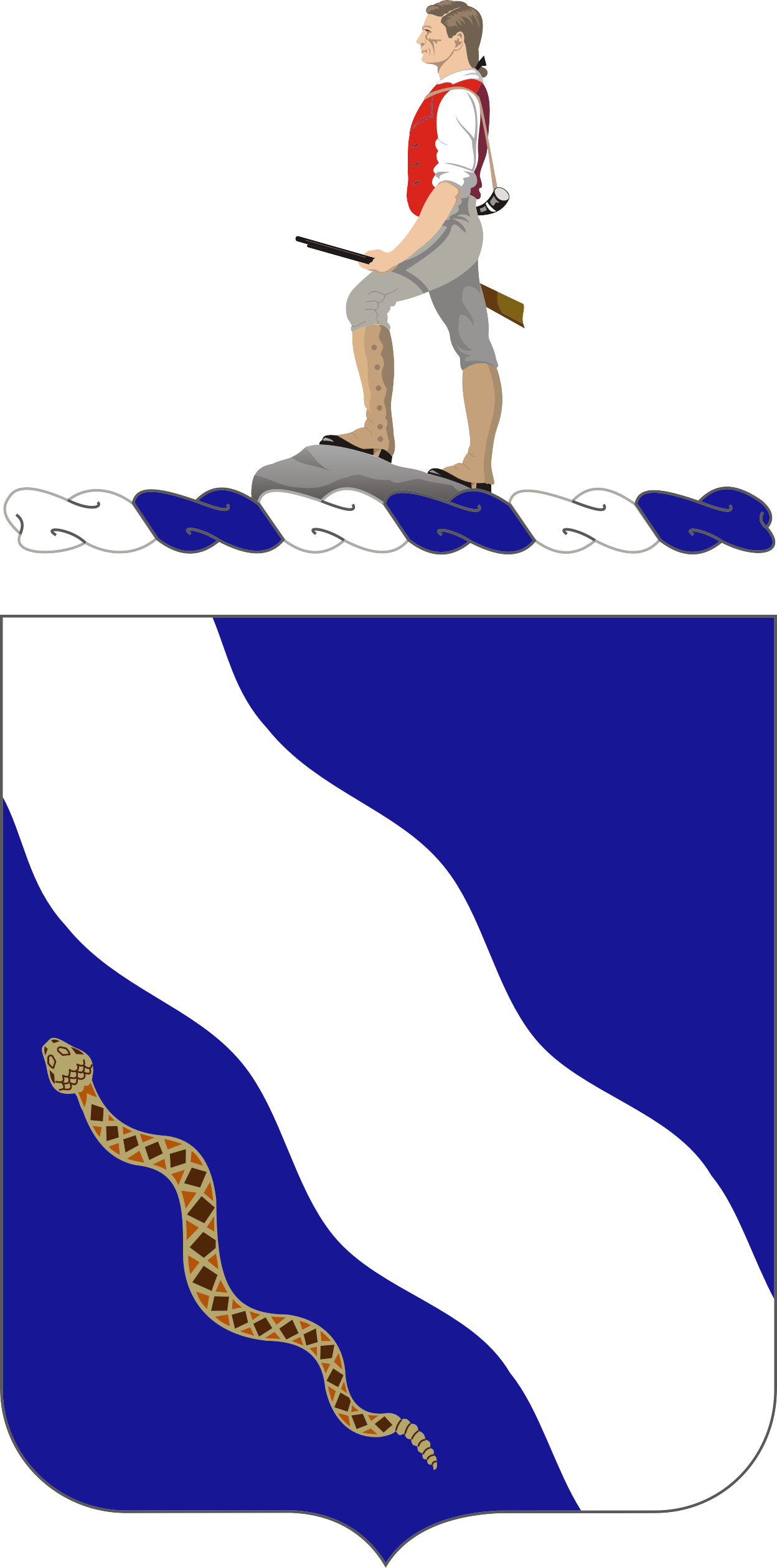
398th Infantry
(now 398th Regiment)
"On the Alert"

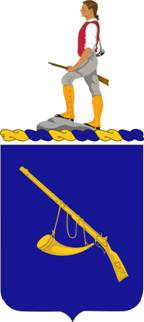
399th Infantry
(now 399th Regiment)
"I AM Ready"

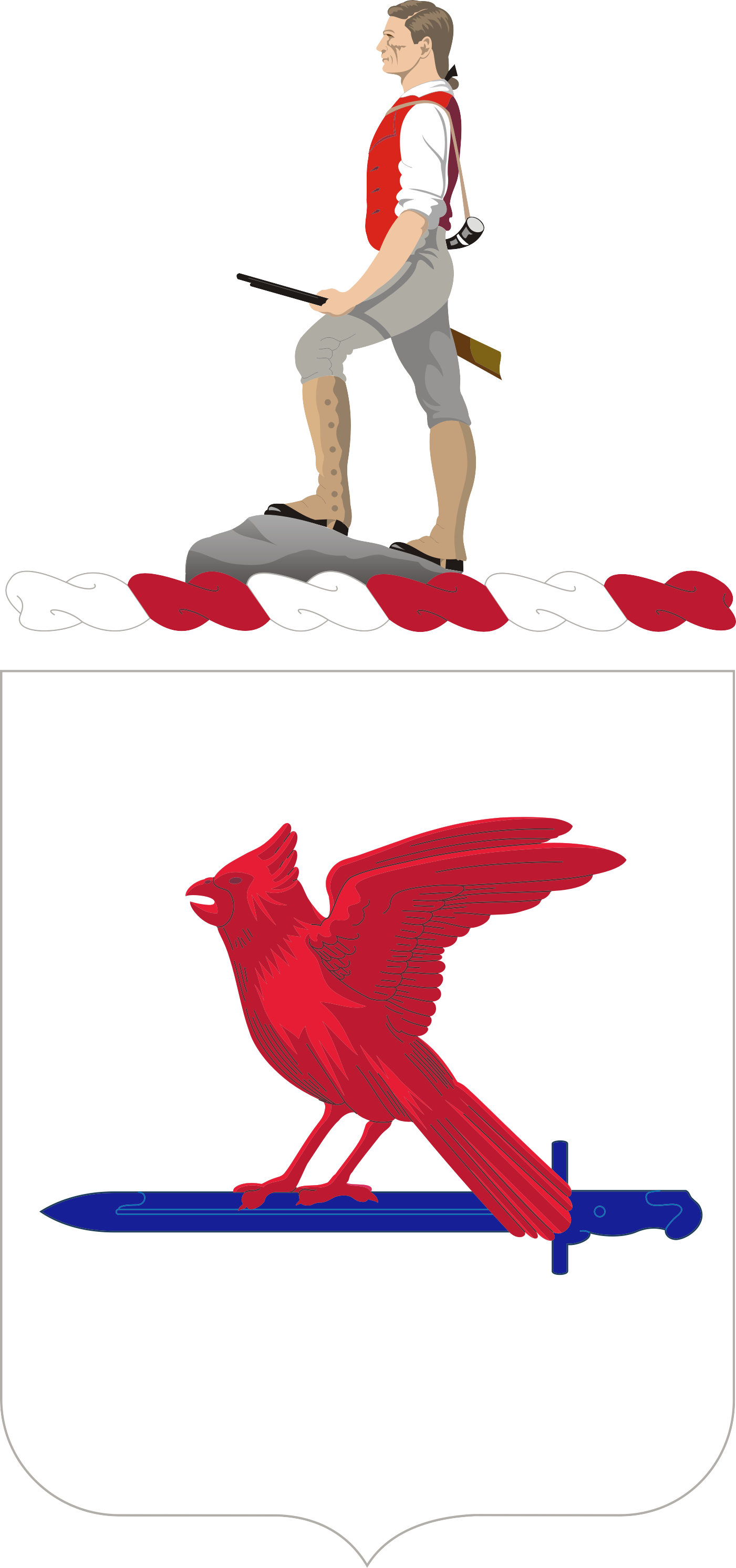
400th Infantry
(now 400th Regiment)
"United We Stand"

=== 401 to 500 ===
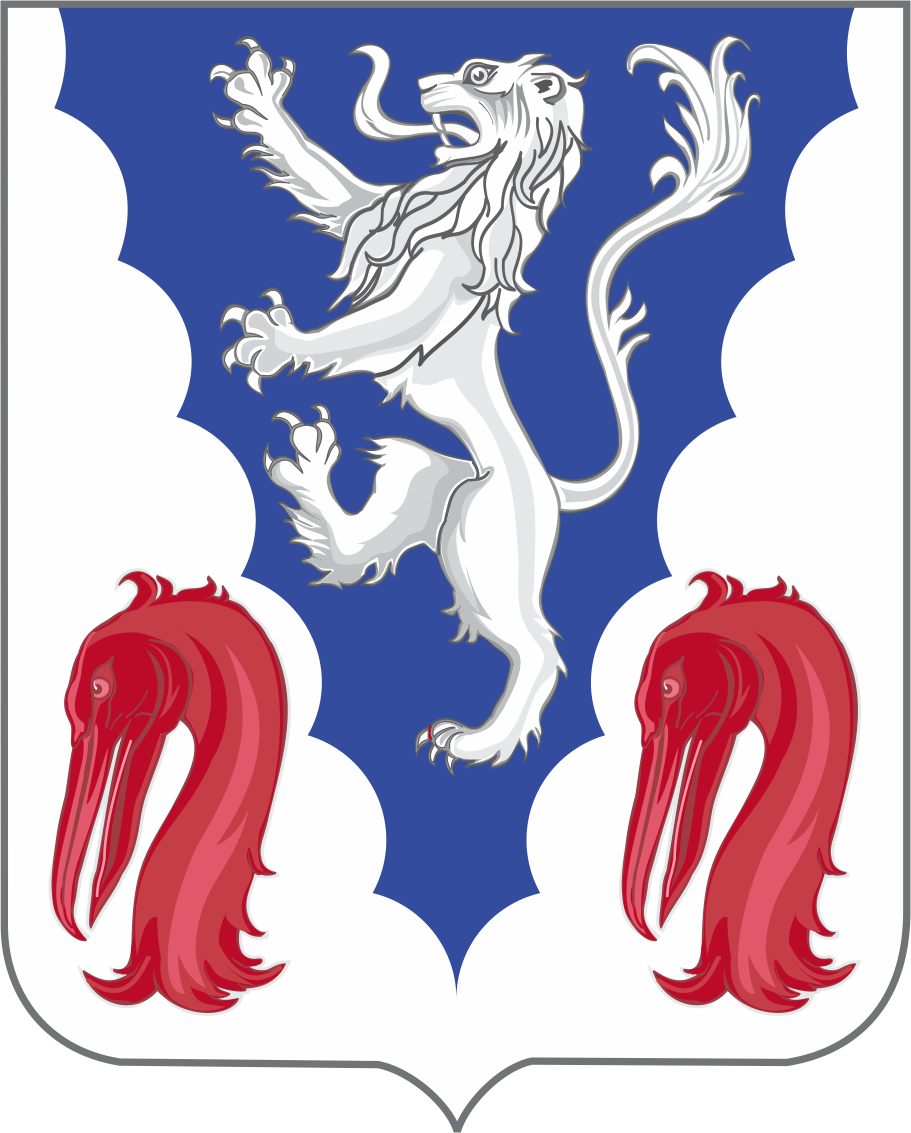
401st Glider Infantry
"Lions of the Skies"

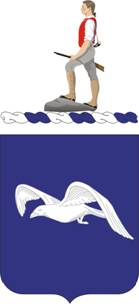
414th Infantry
"Fortior Ex Asperis"Stronger After Difficulties

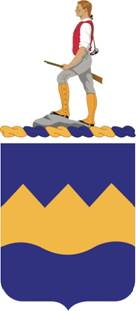
414th Infantry
"Si Vis Pacem Para Bellum"[If You Wish Peace, Prepare For War]

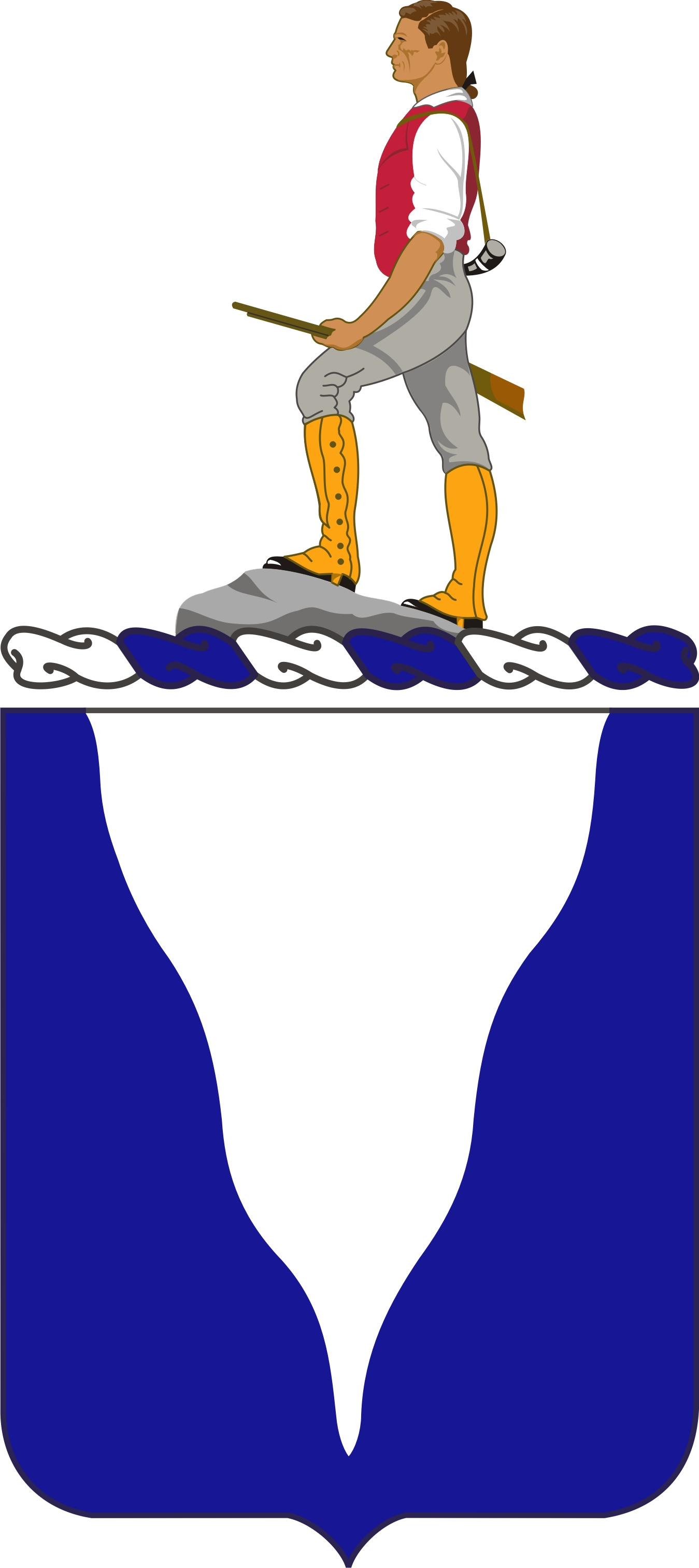
415th Infantry
"Old Faithful"

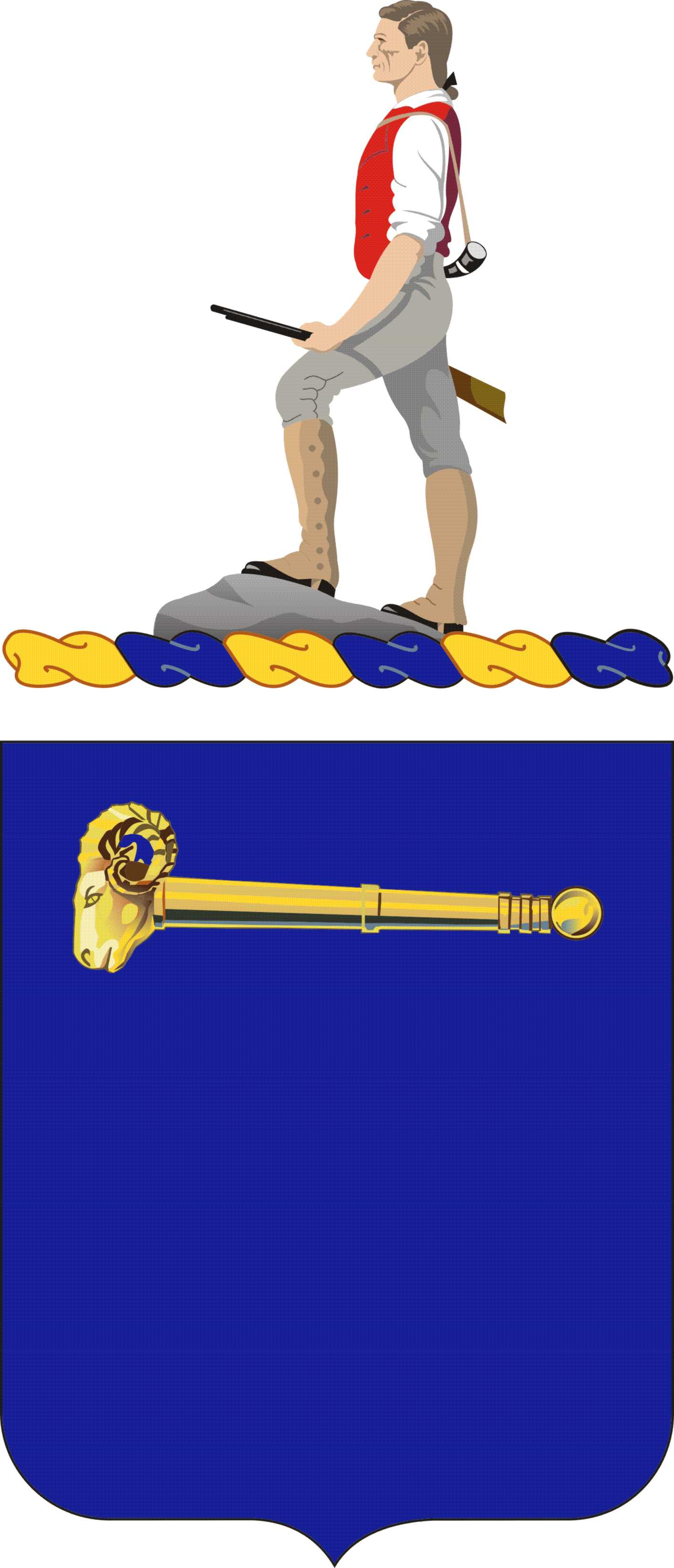
423rd Infantry
"Power"

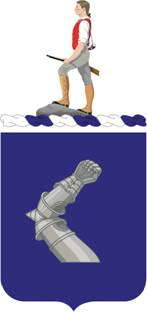
424th Infantry
(now 485th Regiment)
"Perrumpo" (I Break Through)

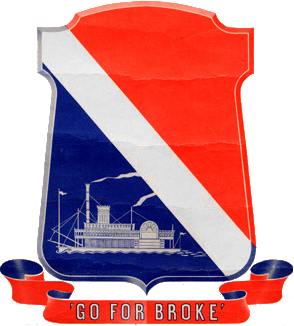
442nd Infantry
"Go For Broke"

=== 501 to 600 ===
501st Infantry
"Geronimo!"

502nd Infantry
"Strike"

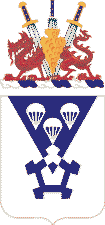
503rd Infantry
"The Rock"
"The Rock Regiment"

504th Infantry
"Strike Hold"
"The Devils in Baggy Pants"

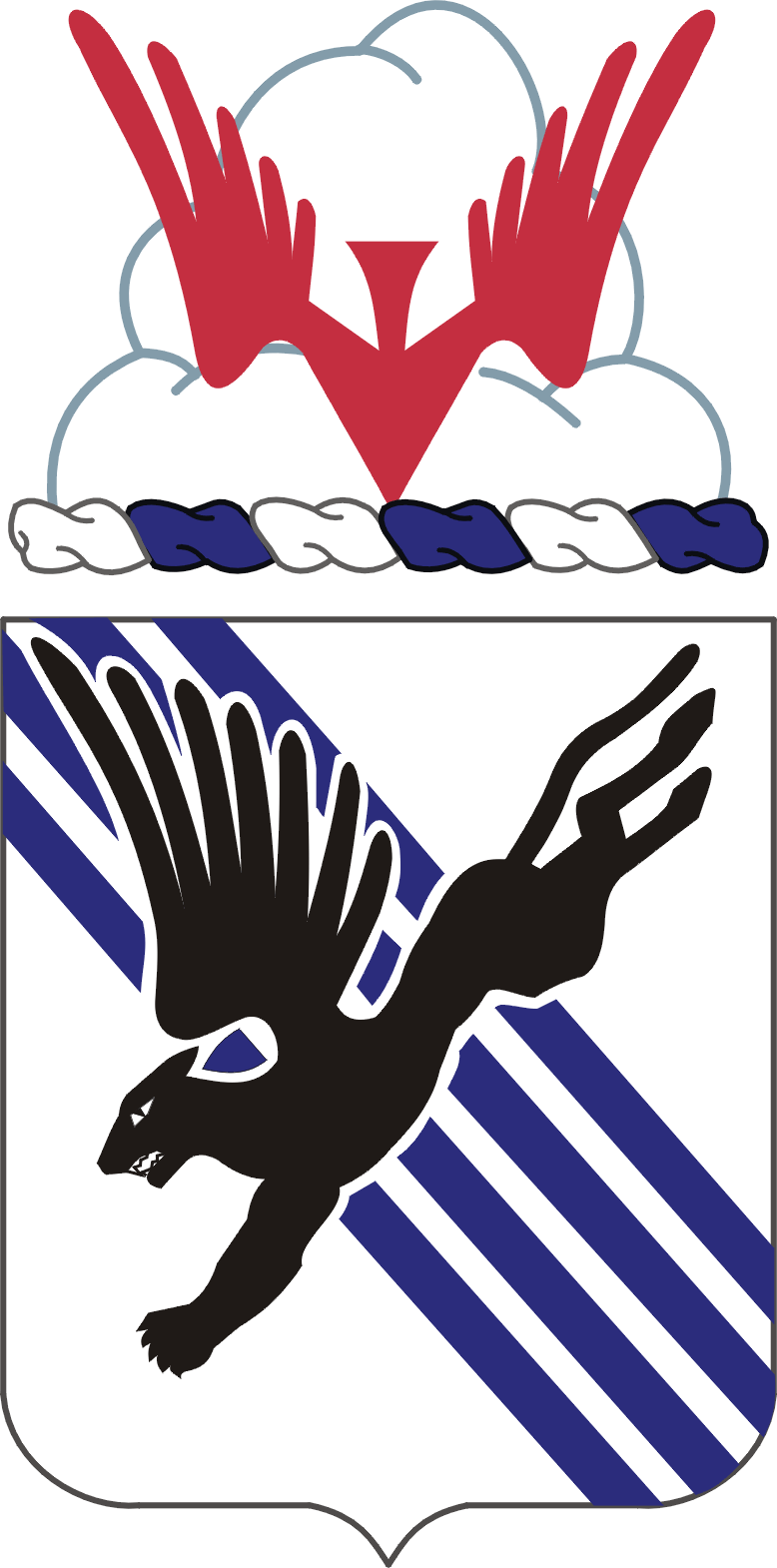
505th Infantry
"H-Minus"
"The Panthers"

506th Infantry
"Currahee" (Stands Alone)

507th Infantry
"Down to Earth"

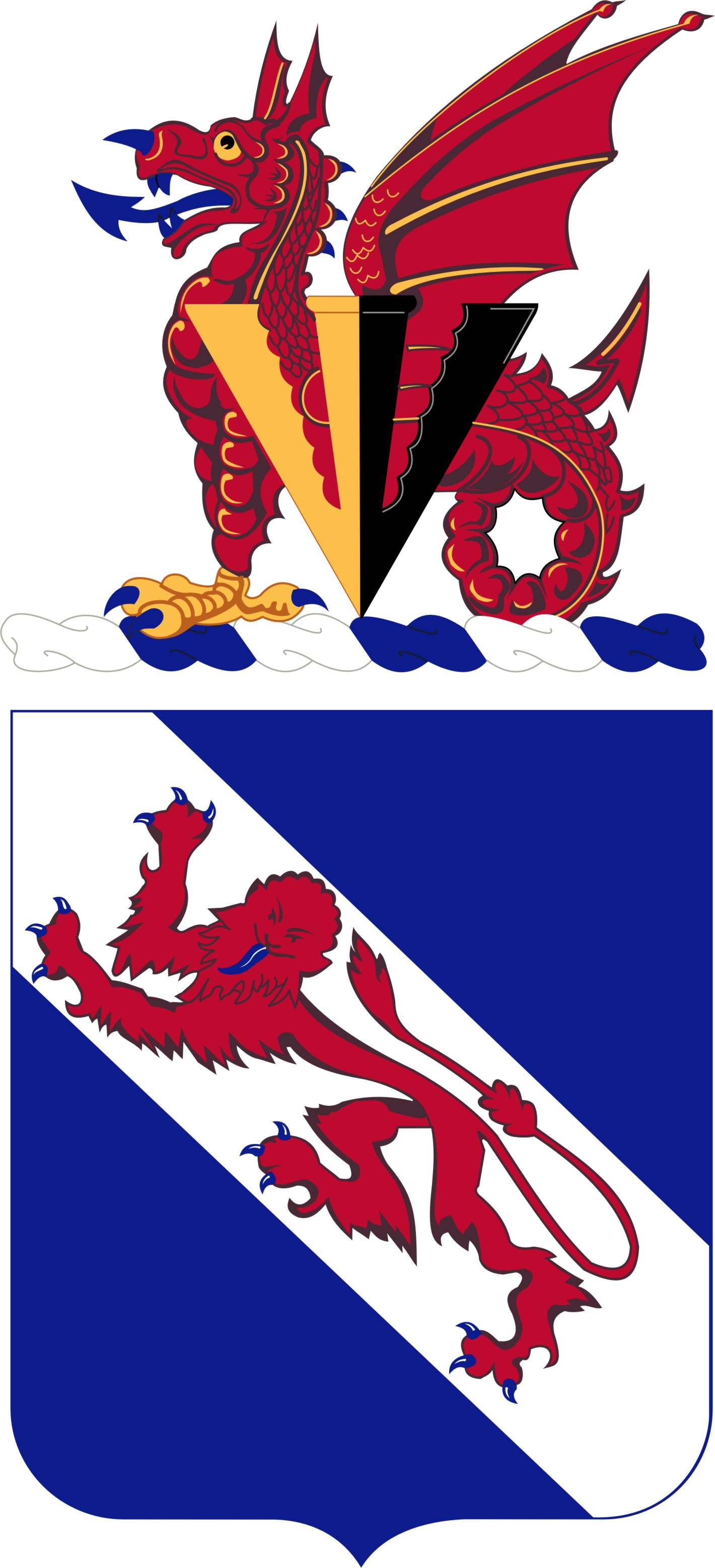
508th Infantry
"Fury From the Sky"
"The Red Devils"

509th Infantry
"All The Way"
"The Gingerbread Men"

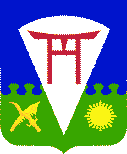
511th Infantry
"Strength From Above"
"The Angels"

513th Infantry
"Sequitis Bastatii""

514th Infantry

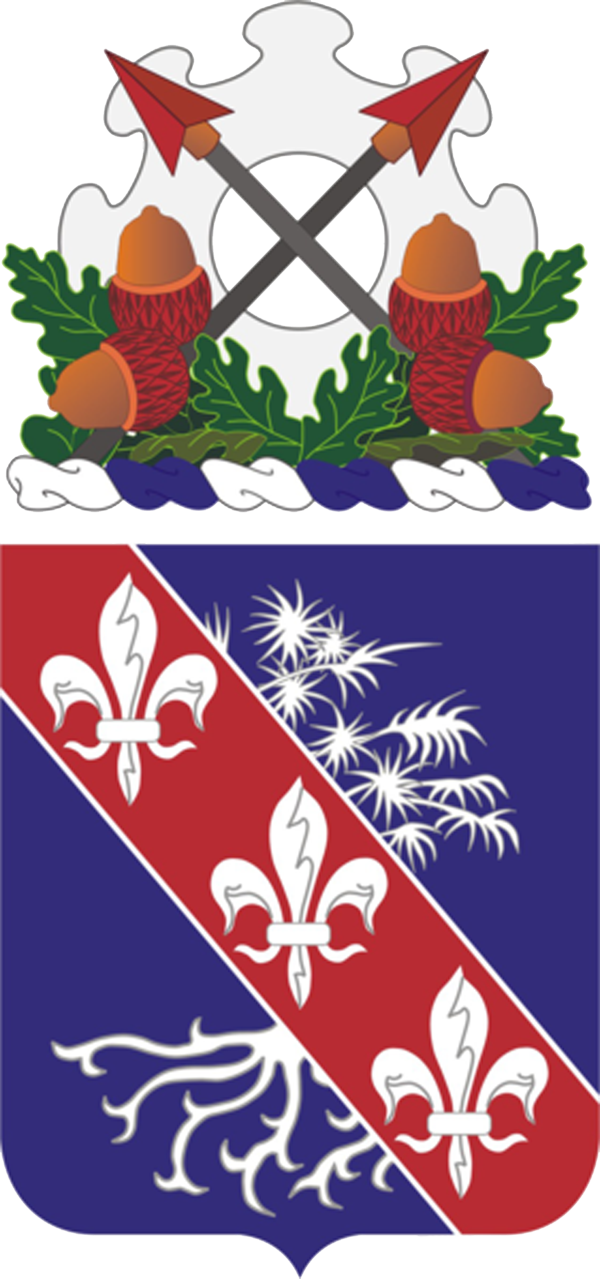
516th Infantry
(now 327th Infantry)
"Honor and Country"
"The Bastogne Bulldogs"

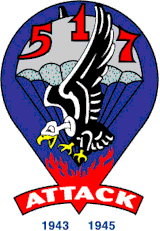
517th Infantry
"Attack!"
"The Battling Buzzards"

518th Infantry
(now 518th Regiment)
"Virtus, Fides, Honor"

519th Infantry

541st Infantry

542nd Infantry

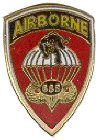
555th Infantry

== Medical units ==
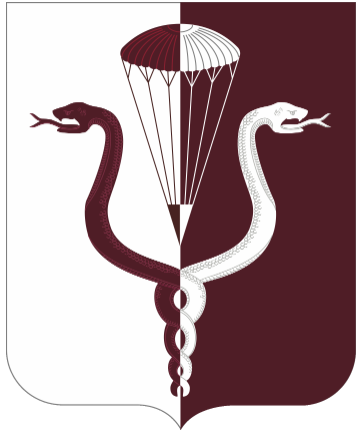
11th Medical Battalion
"Count on Us"

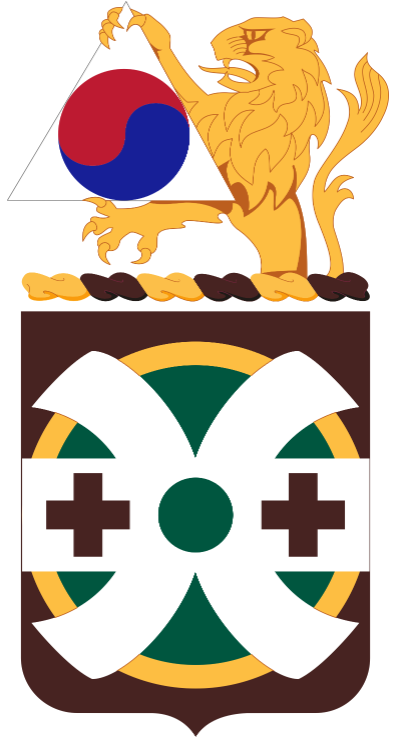
16th Medical Battalion
"Support to Health Care"

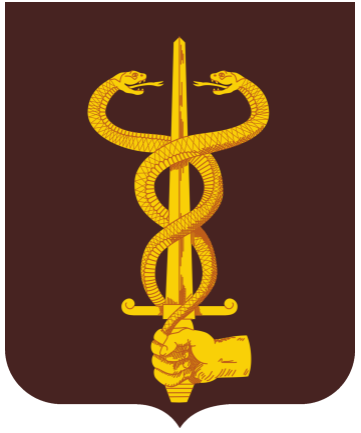
23rd Medical Battalion
"That Others May Live"

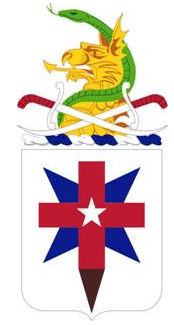
32nd Medical Battalion
"Support for Life"

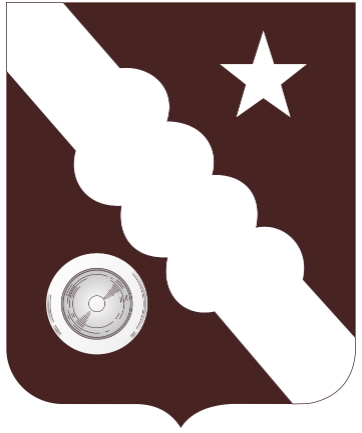
34th Medical Battalion
"Pro Patria, Pro Humanitate" (For Country, For Humanity)

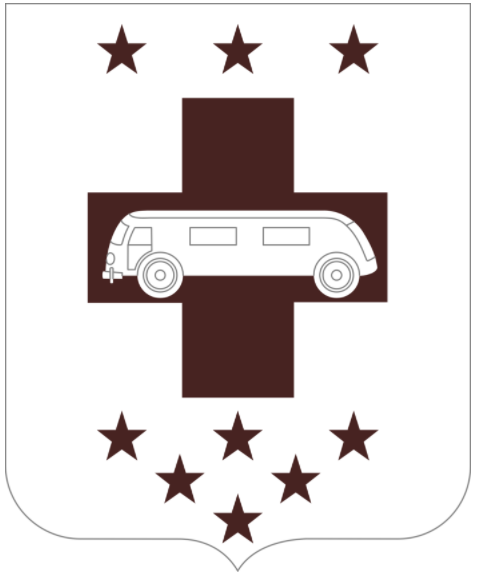
36th Medical Battalion
"Auxilium Cito" (Aid Speedily)

37th Medical Battalion
(Coat of Arms not authorized) "The Utmost for the Best"

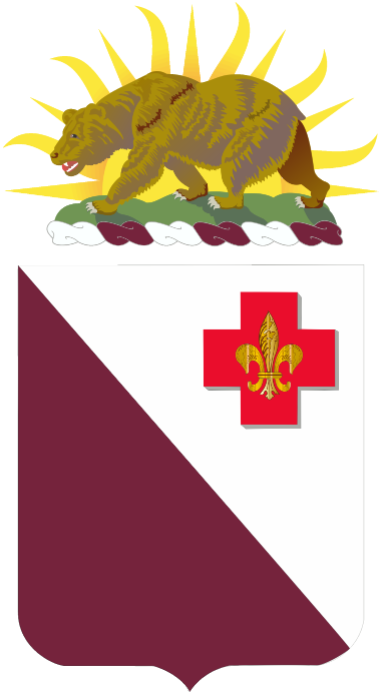
40th Medical Battalion
"Serviant et Saviant" (Serve and Save)

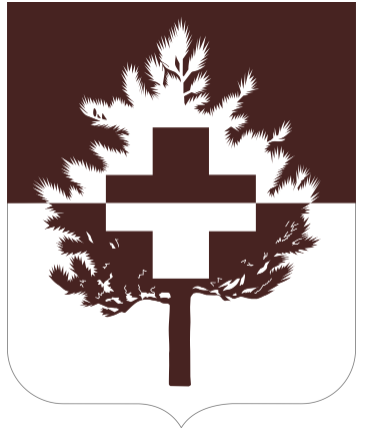
46th Medical Battalion
"Ut Iterum Servias" (That You May Serve Again)

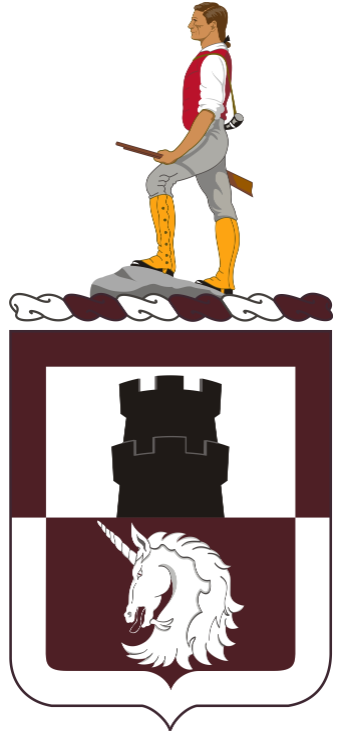
49th Medical Battalion
"Perseverance Prevails"

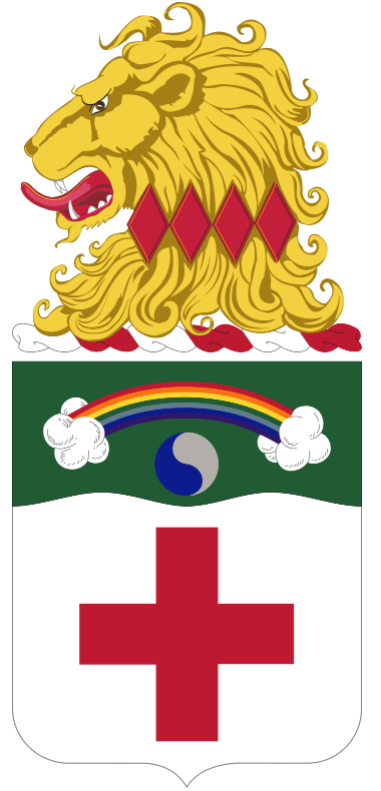
50th Medical Battalion
"Quo Fas et Gloria Ducant" (Where Duty And Glory Lead)

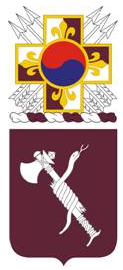
52nd Medical Battalion
"Maintain the Fighting Strength"

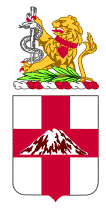
56th Medical Battalion
"Peshuta-Akichita" (Medicine Soldiers)

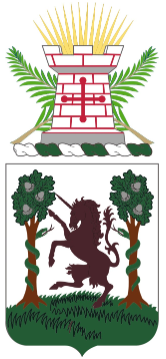
61st Medical Battalion
"Inest Clementia Forti" (Mercy Is Inherent In The Brave)

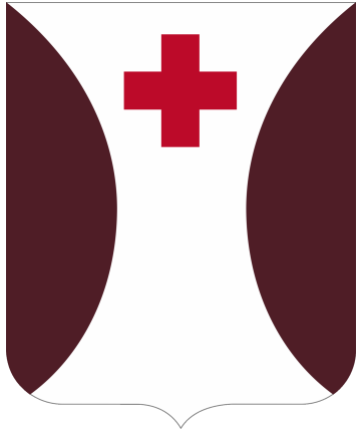
70th Medical Battalion
"Que Los Mas Puedan Combatir" (That The Most May Fight)

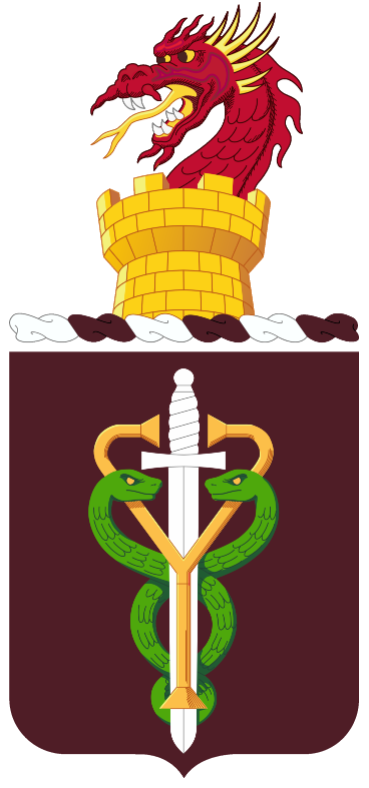
74th Medical Battalion
"Support the Line"

111th Medical Battalion
"Dedicated And Diligent"

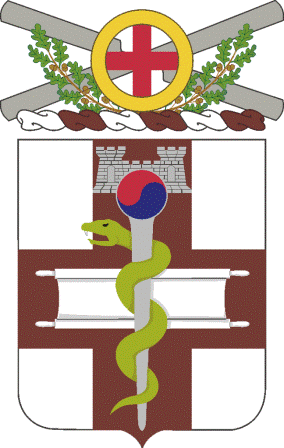
421st Medical Battalion
"Anyone, Anywhere, Anytime"

== Military Intelligence ==
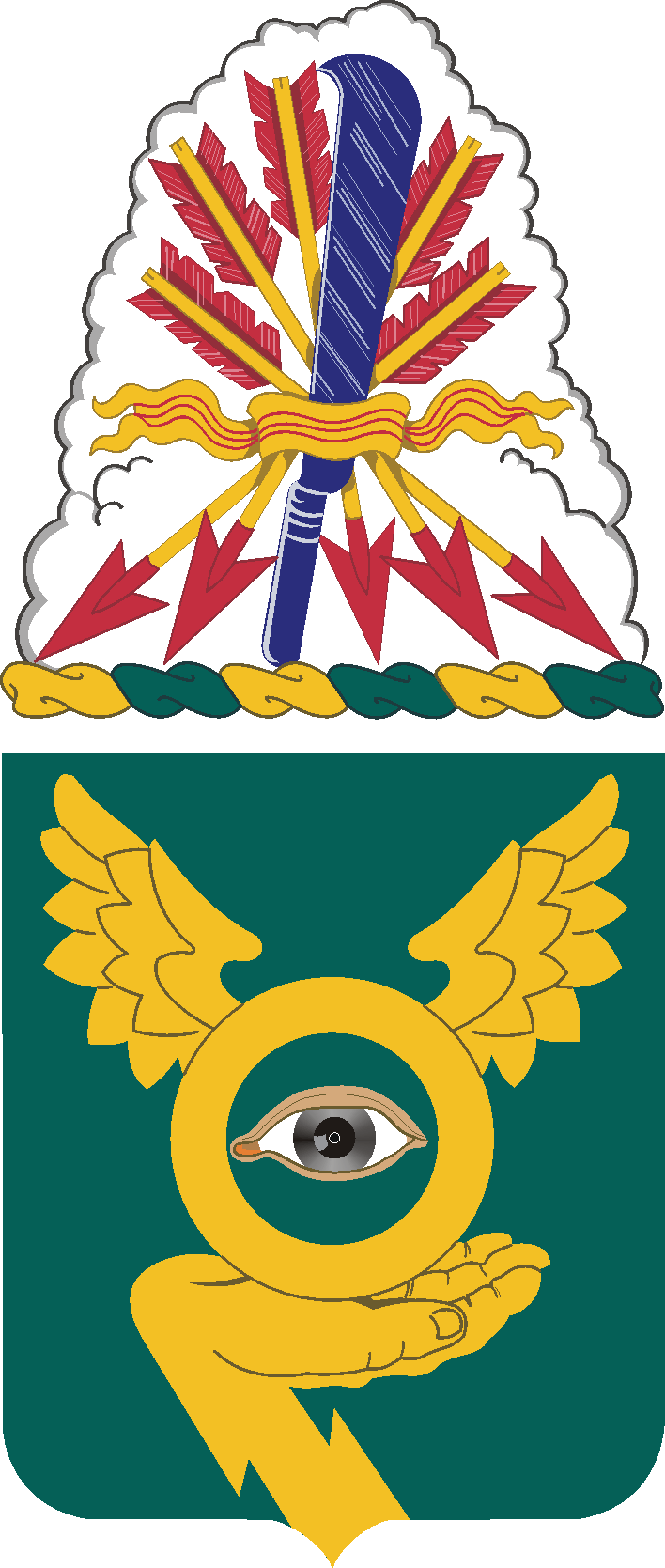
1st Military Intelligence Battalion
"We Labor to Inform"

104th Military Intelligence Battalion
"Watchful and Ready"

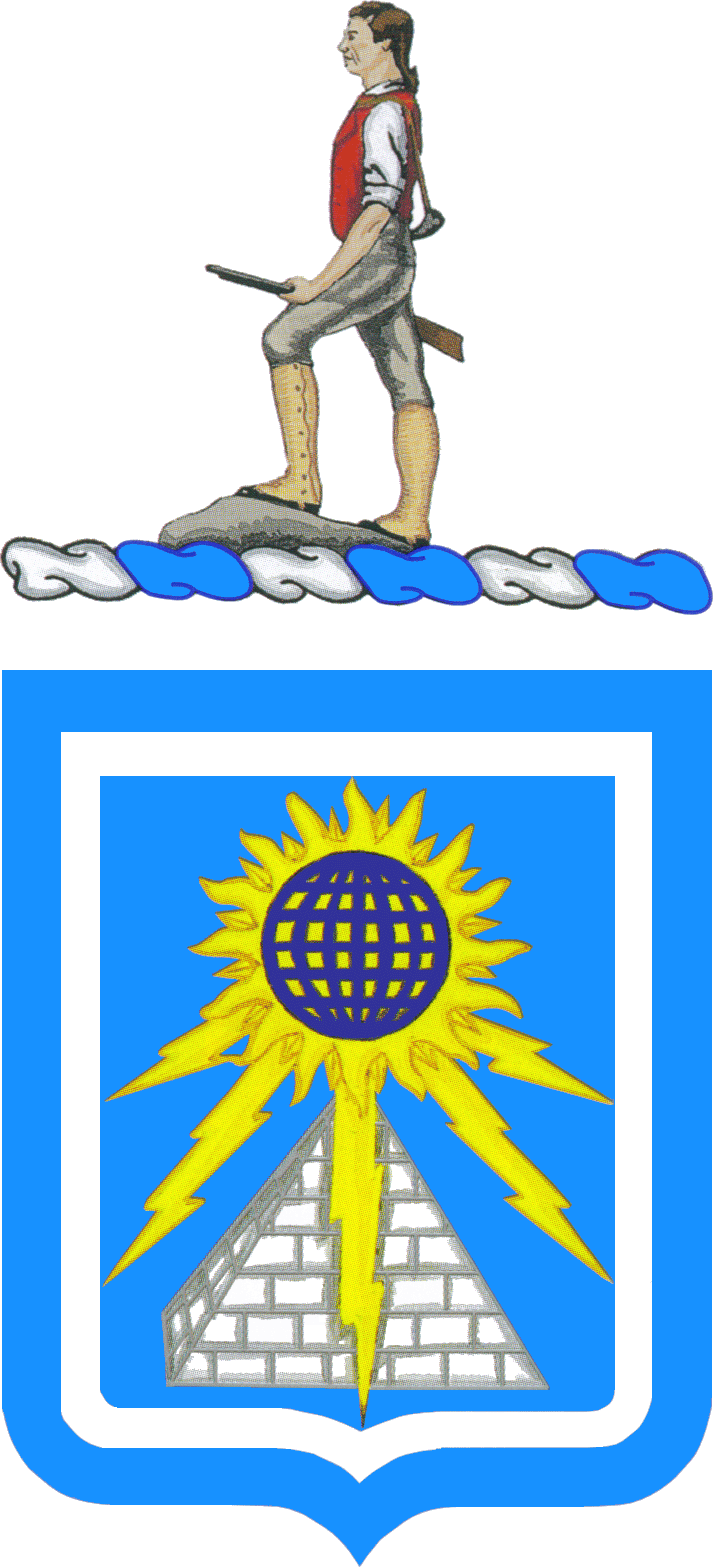
140th Military Intelligence Battalion
"Semper Vigil"

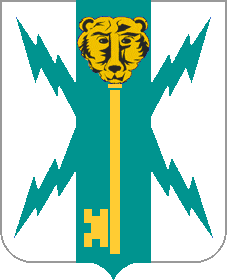
309th Military Intelligence Battalion
"Sentinels of Security"

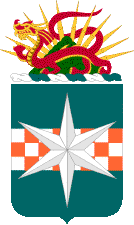
313th Military Intelligence Battalion
"Savoir C’Est Pouvoir"

368th Military Intelligence Battalion
"Vanguard of the Pacific"

519th Military Intelligence Battalion
"Strength Through Intelligence"

649th Military Intelligence Battalion
"Lone Star Vigilance"

== Military Police units ==
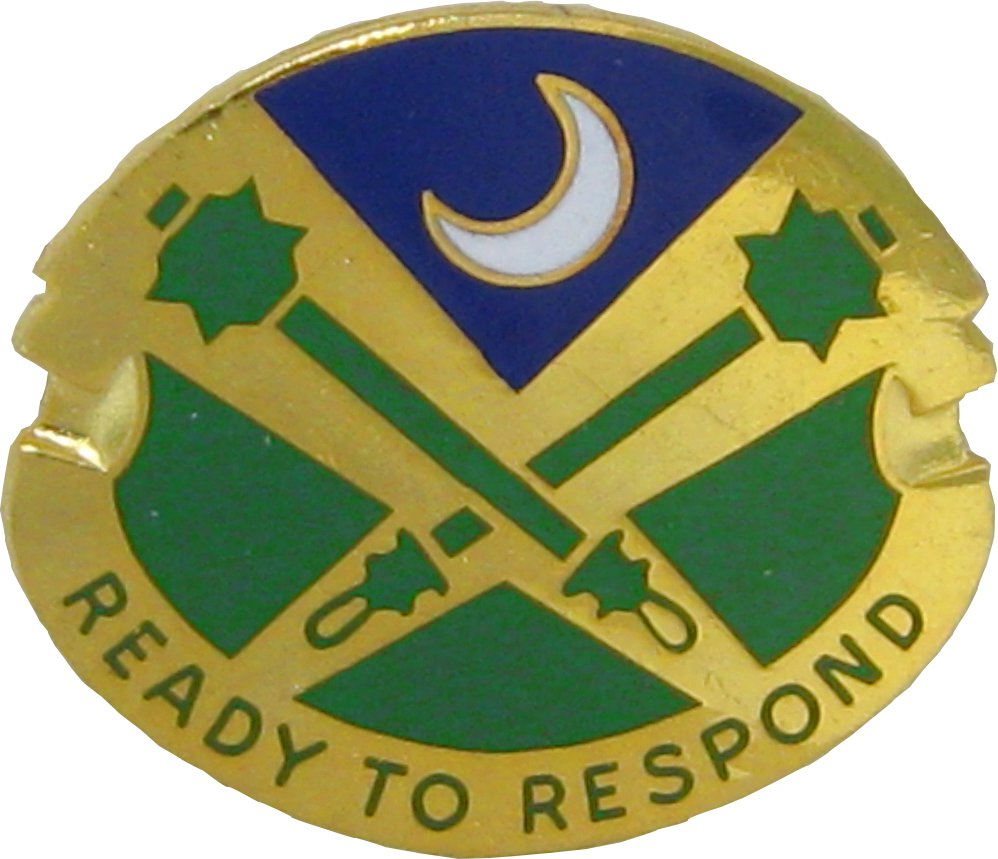
51st Military Police Battalion
"Ready To Respond"

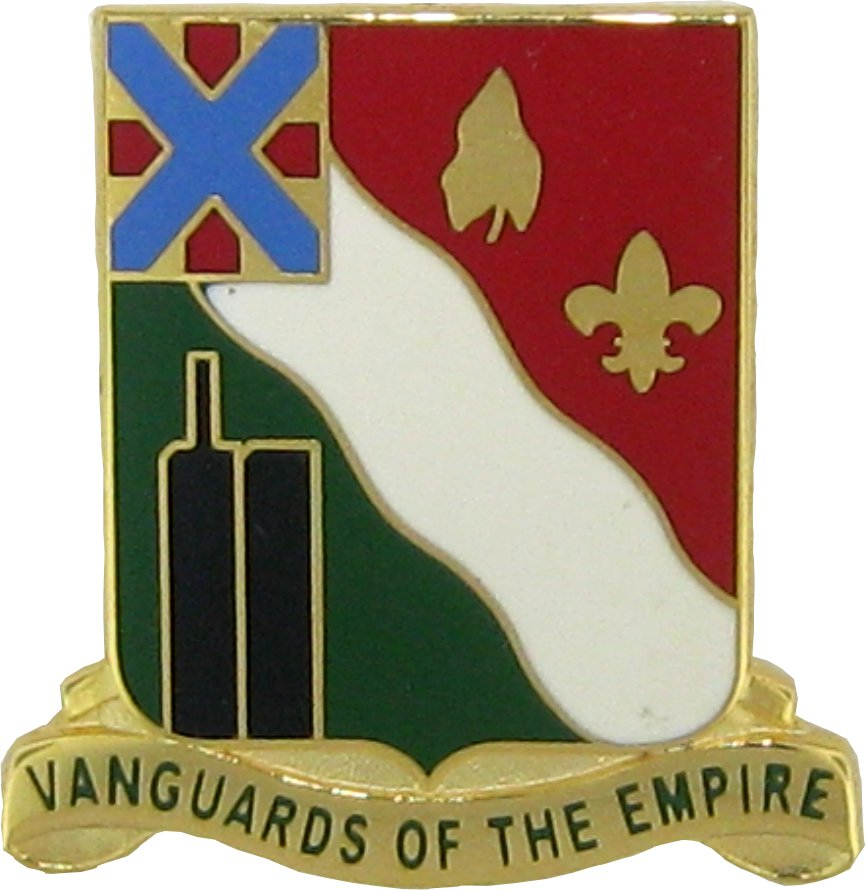
104th Military Police Battalion
"Vanguards Of The Empire"

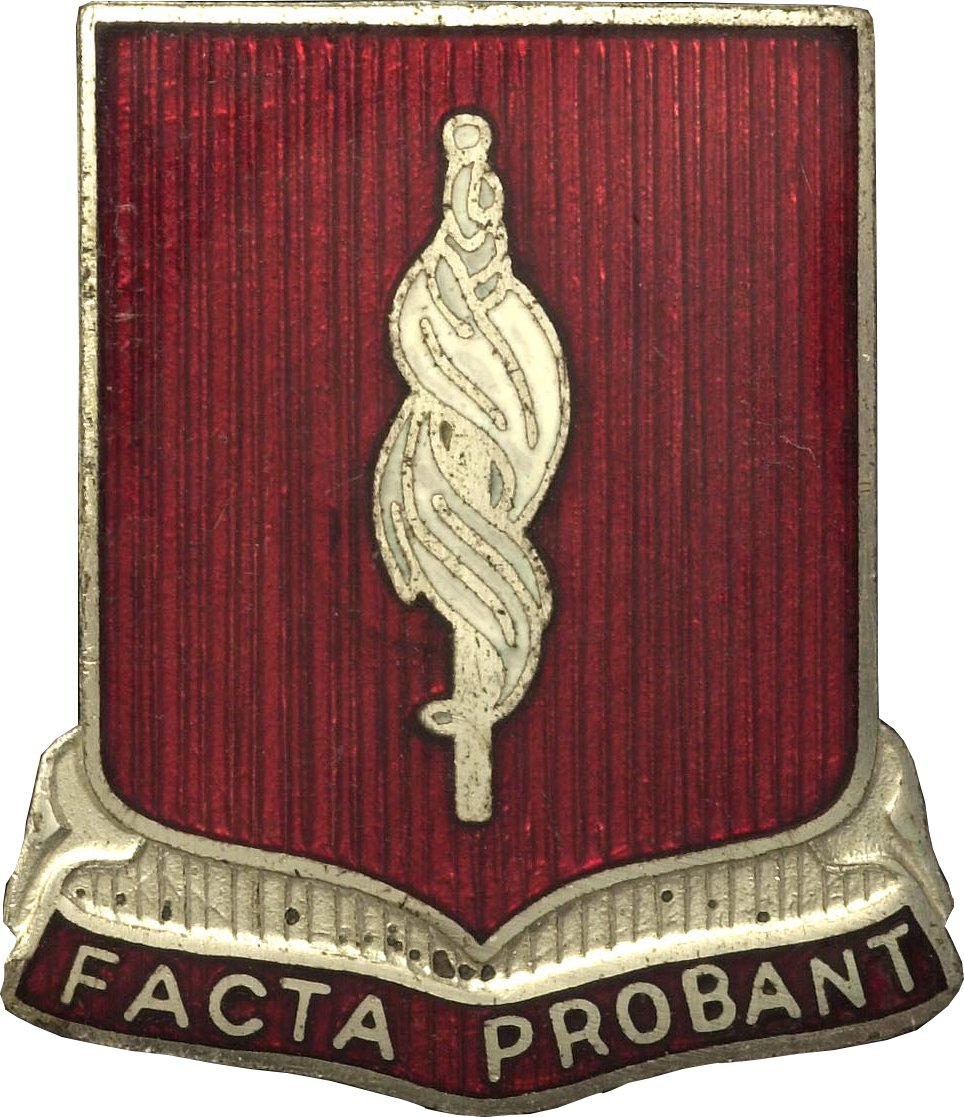
118th Military Police Battalion
"Facta Probant"

136th Military Police Battalion
"Service, Safety, Security"

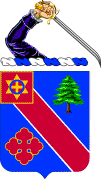
211th Military Police Battalion
(formerly 220th Infantry Regiment)
"Monstrat Viam" (It Points the Way)

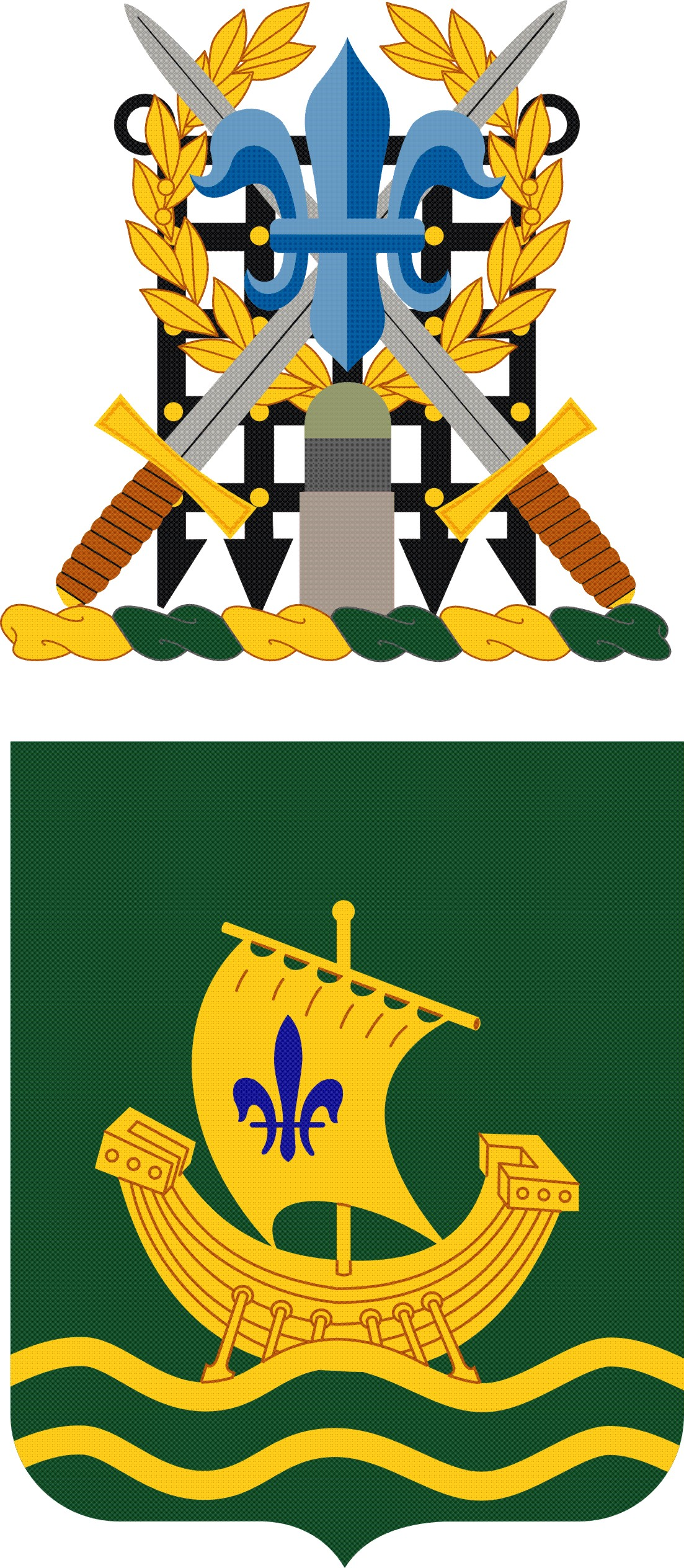
709th Military Police Battalion

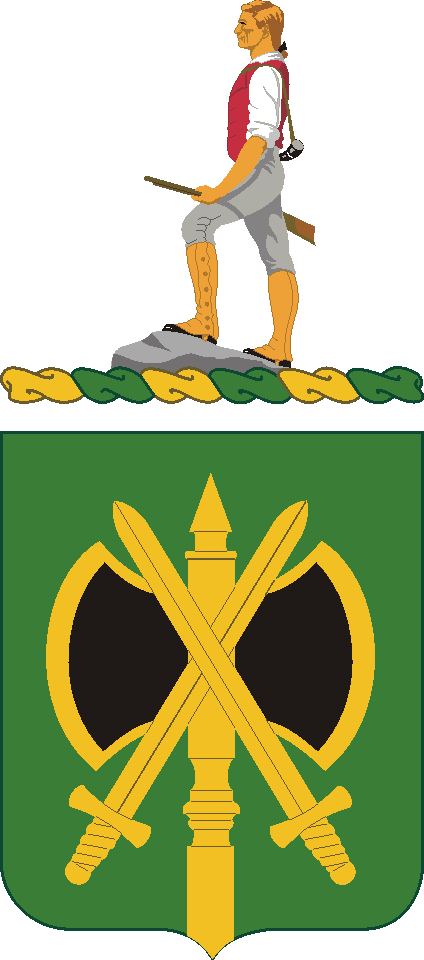
785th Military Police Battalion

== Signal ==
17th Signal Battalion

28th Signal Battalion

35th Signal Battalion

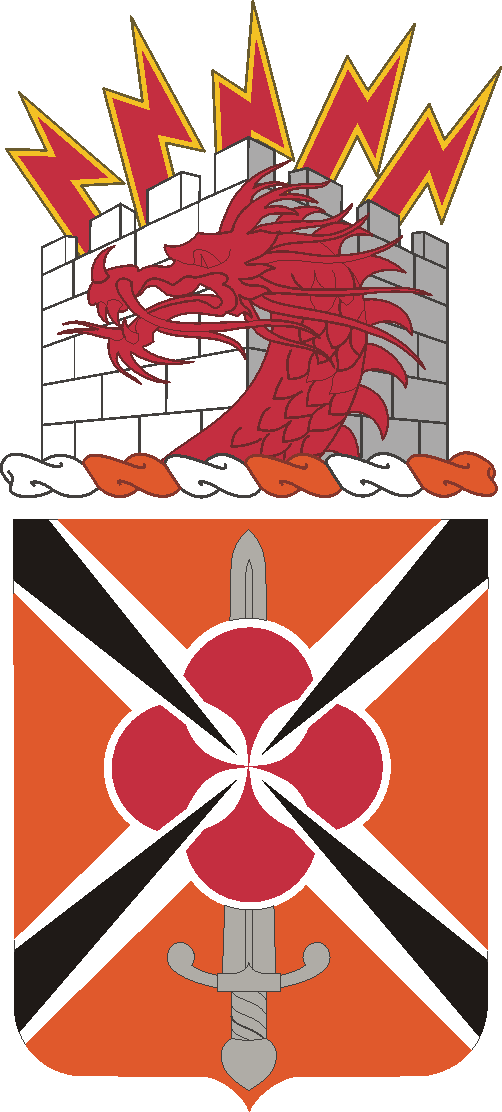
39th Signal Battalion

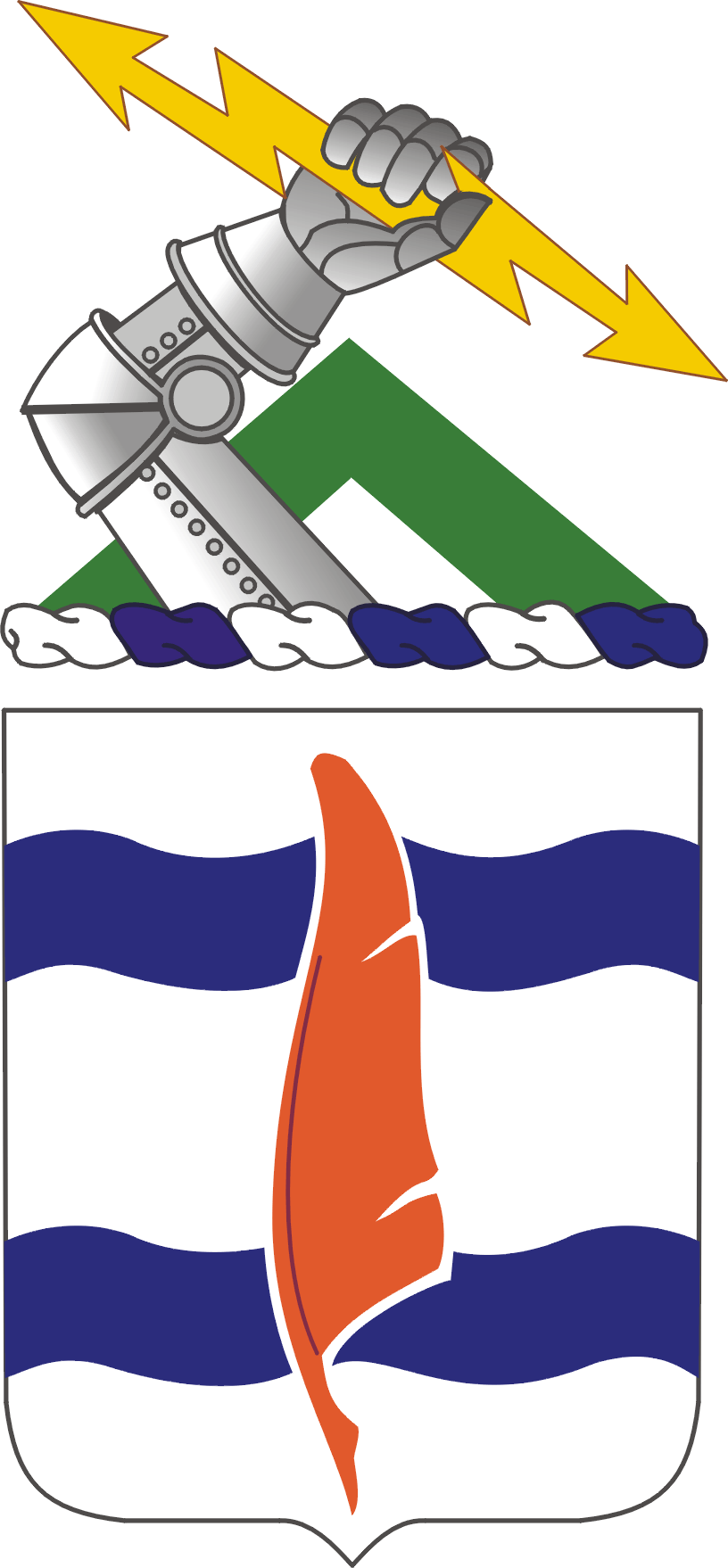
102nd Signal Battalion

112th Signal Battalion

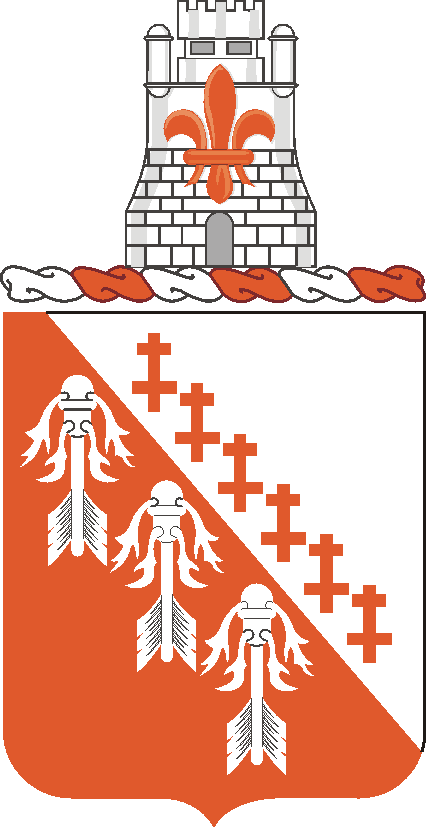
121st Signal Battalion

136th Signal Battalion
"Command On The Move"

136th Signal Battalion
"Voice Of The Battlefield"

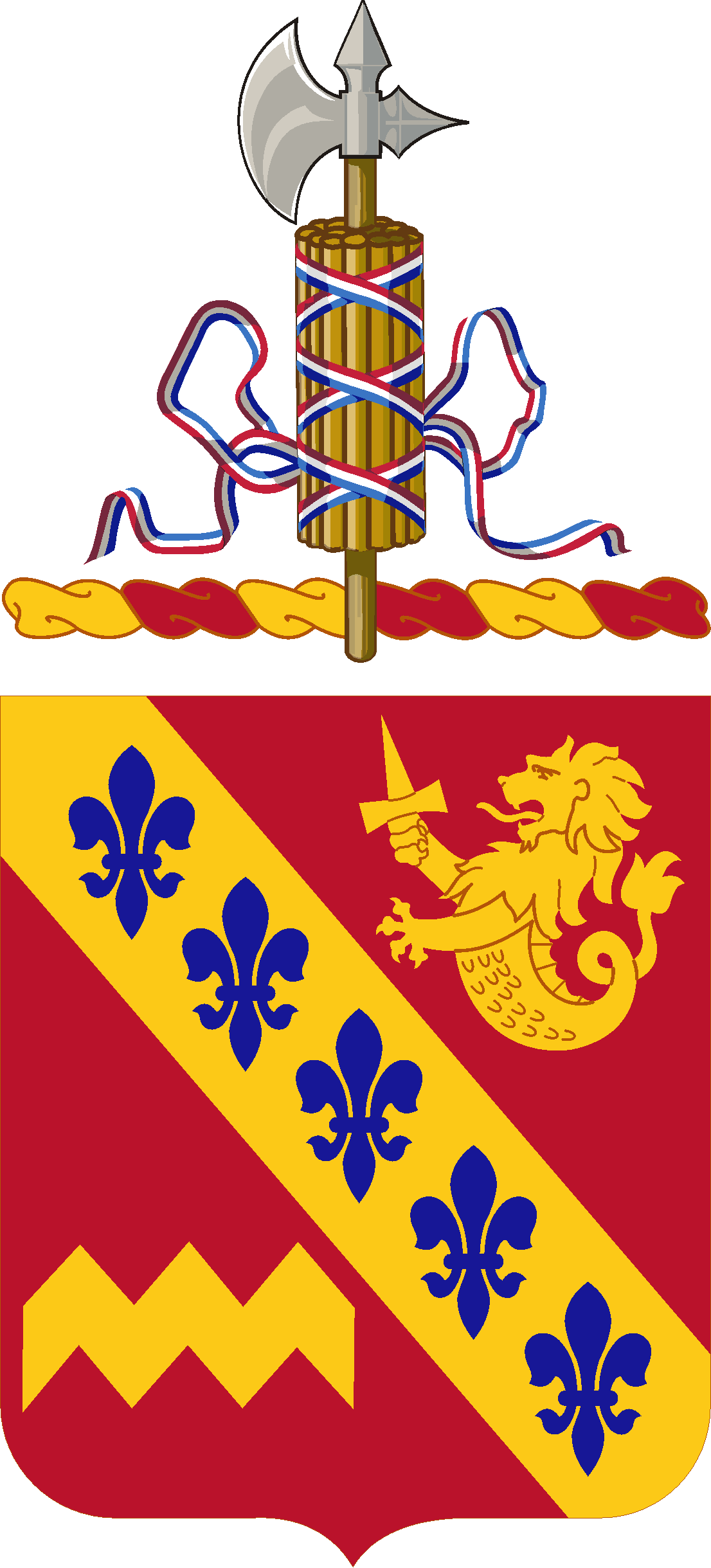
140th Signal Battalion

141st Signal Battalion

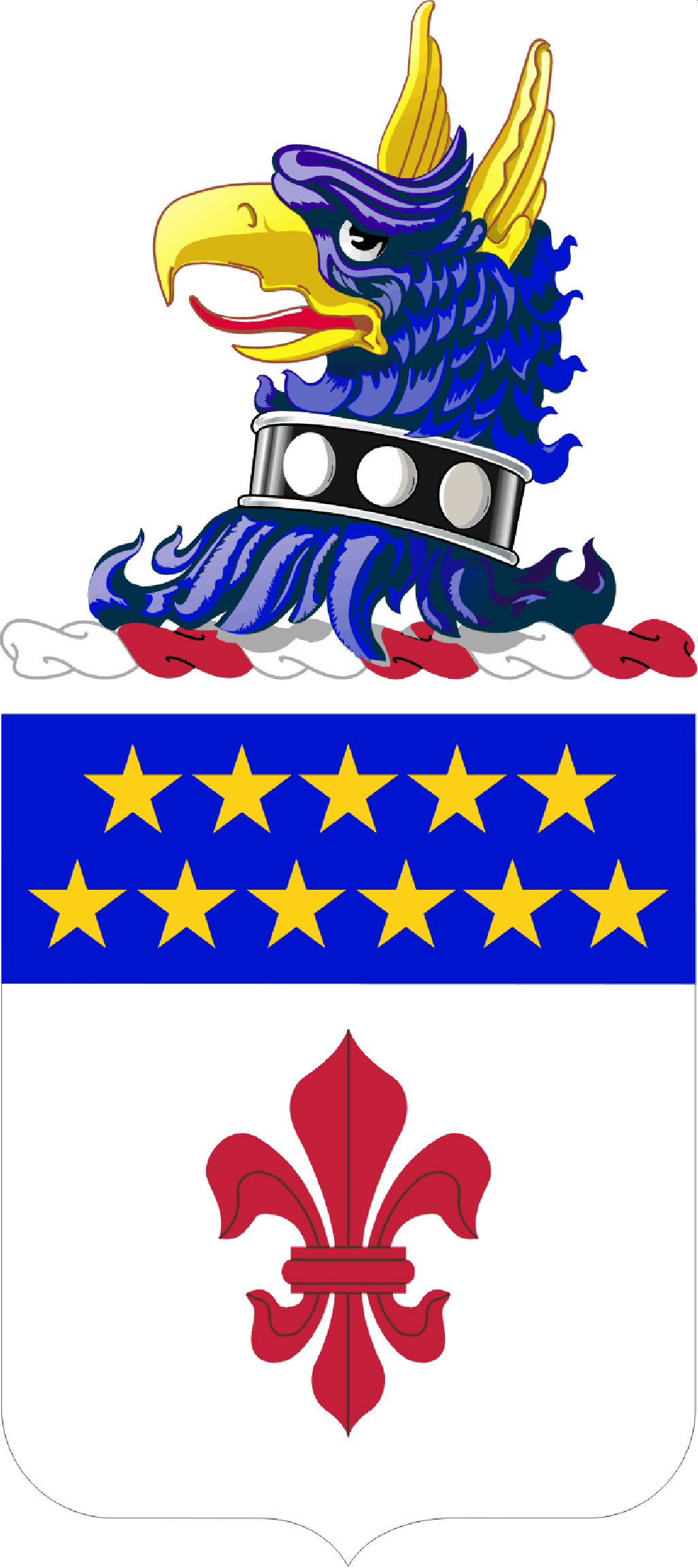
198th Signal Battalion
""First Regiment of First State"

== Special Forces ==
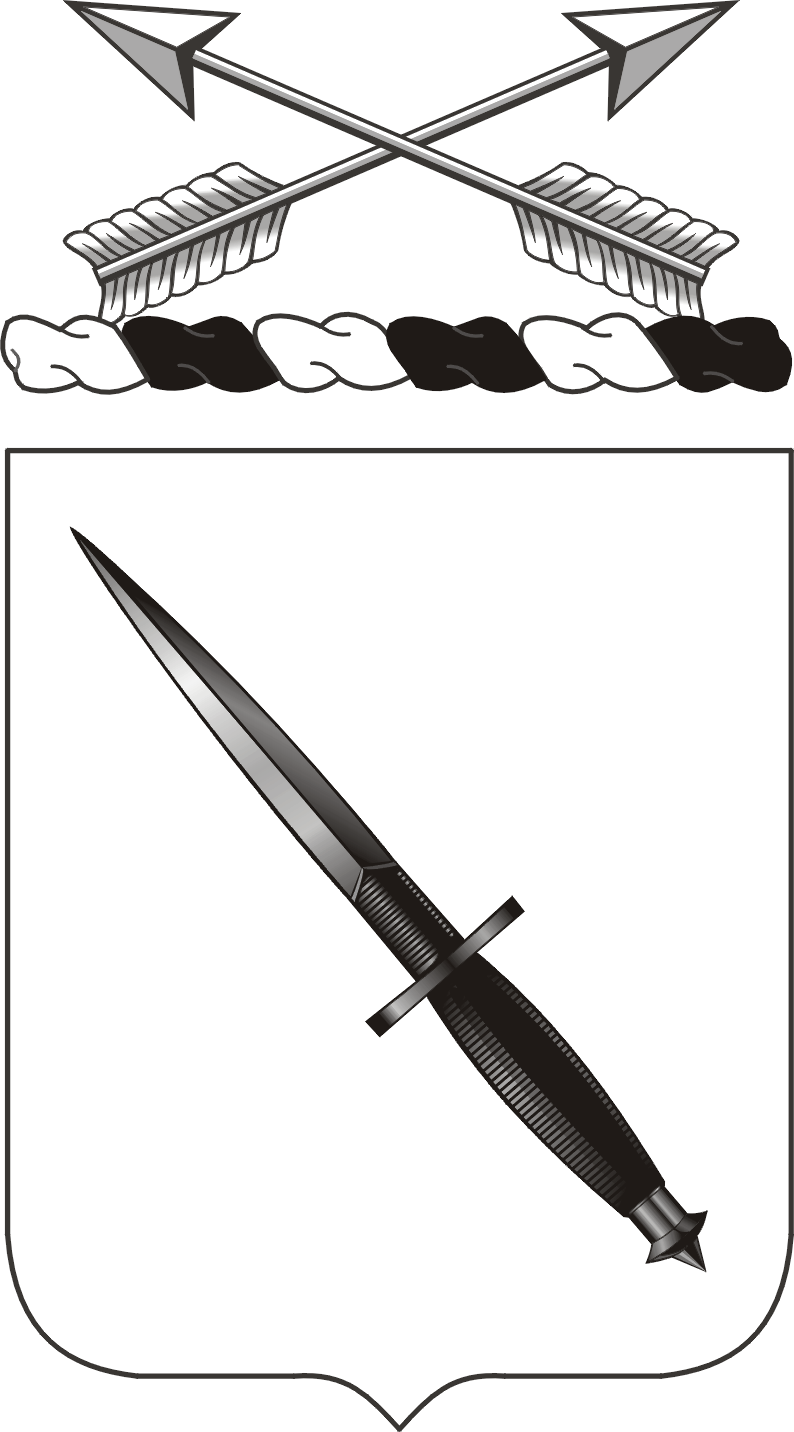
1st Special Forces Regiment
"De Oppresso Liber"

== Support ==
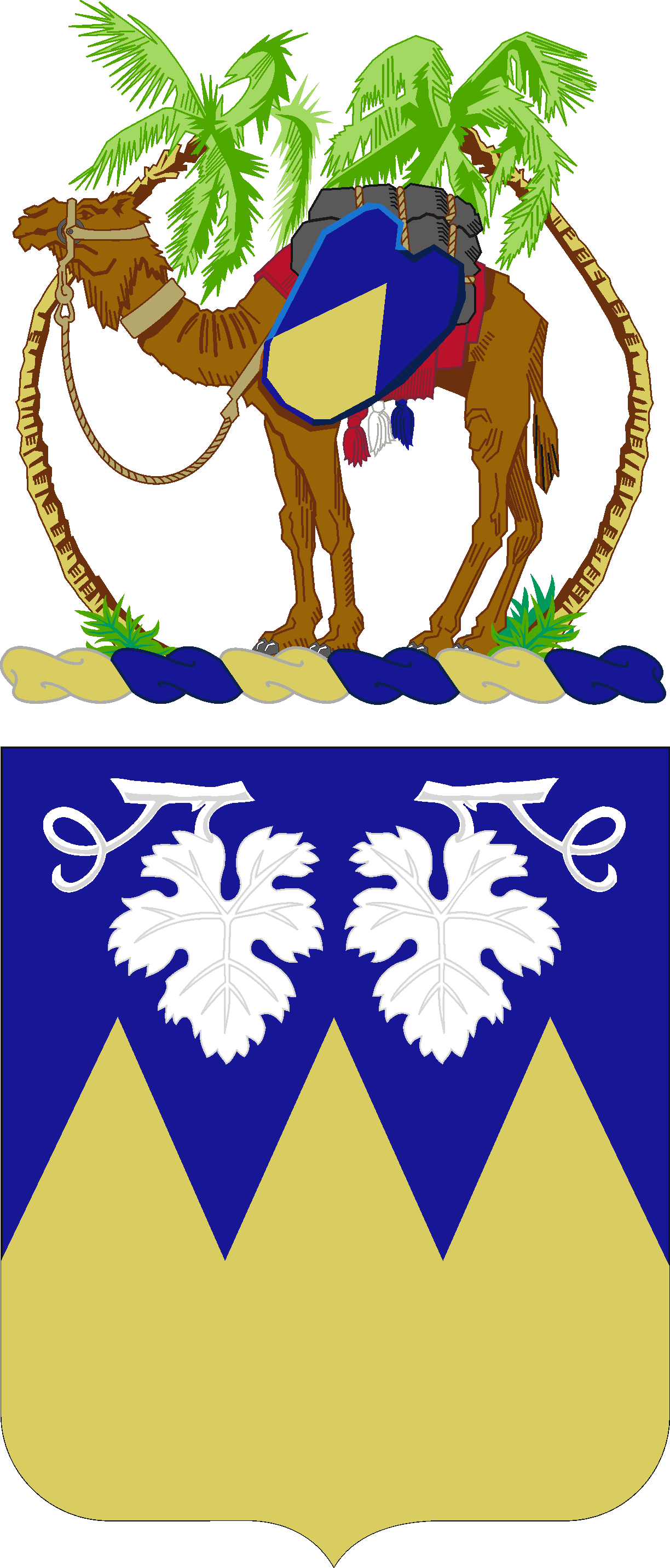
13th Combat Sustainment Support Battalion
"Find a way"

63rd Brigade Support Battalion
"Victory's Wagon"

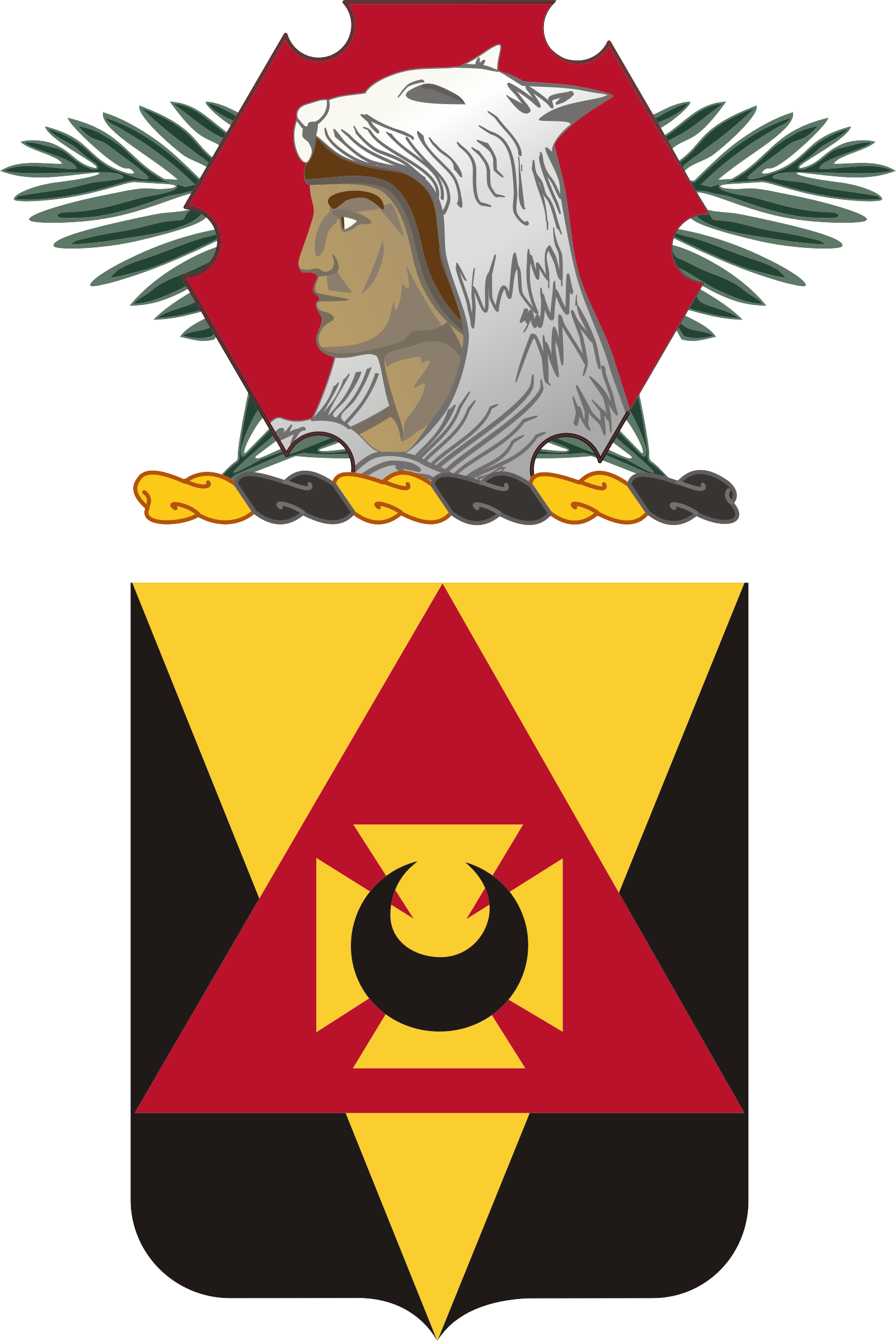
87th Combat Sustainment Support Battalion
"Base of the Pyramid"

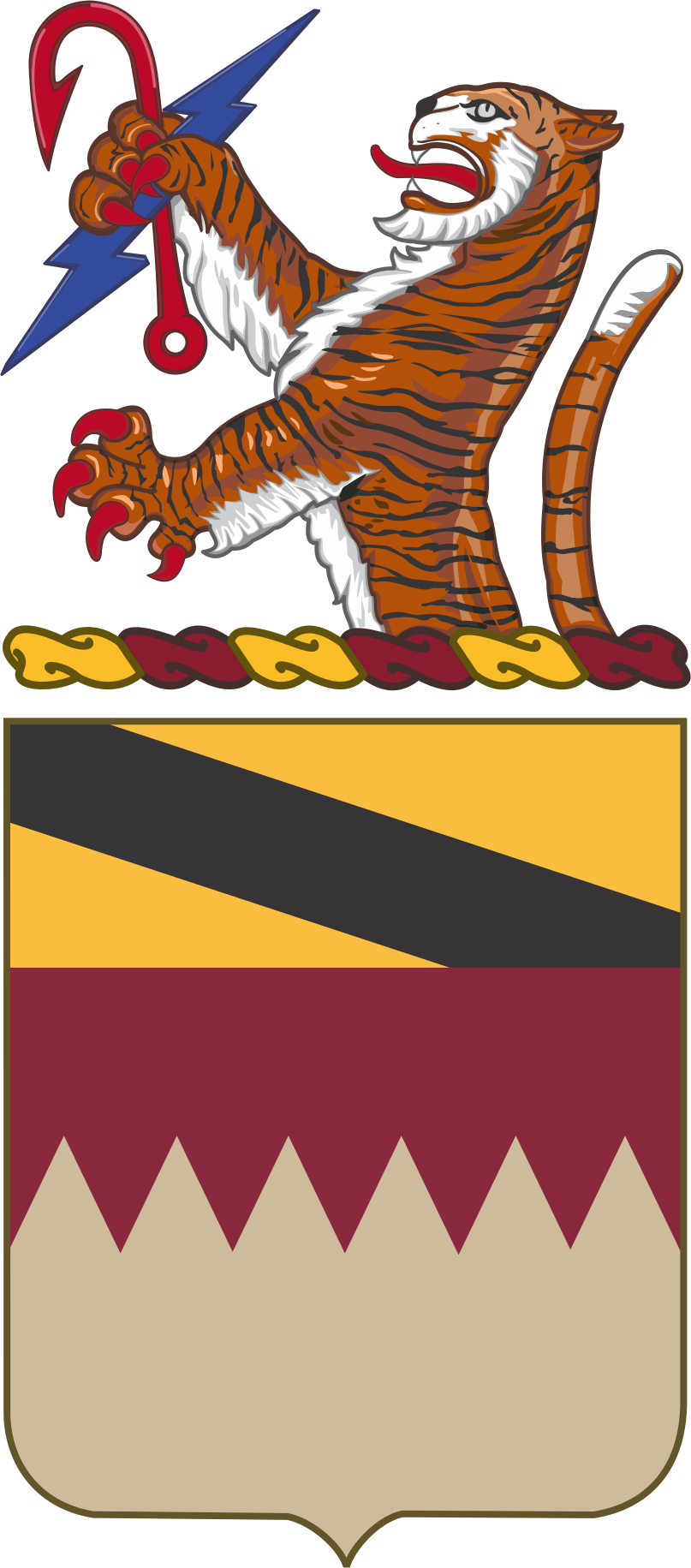
115th Brigade Support Battalion
"Prepared in Peace or War"

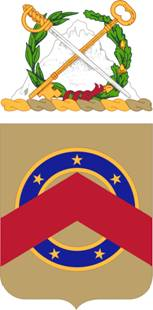
125th Brigade Support Battalion
"Bulldog Support"

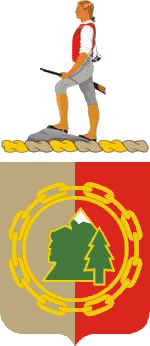
167th Support Battalion
"Links of Strength"

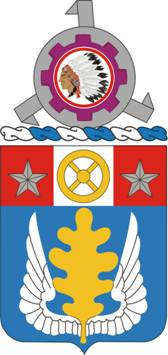
168th Brigade Support Battalion
"Pursuit of Excellence"

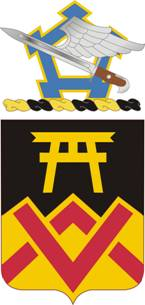
173rd Brigade Support Battalion
"To Our Utmost"

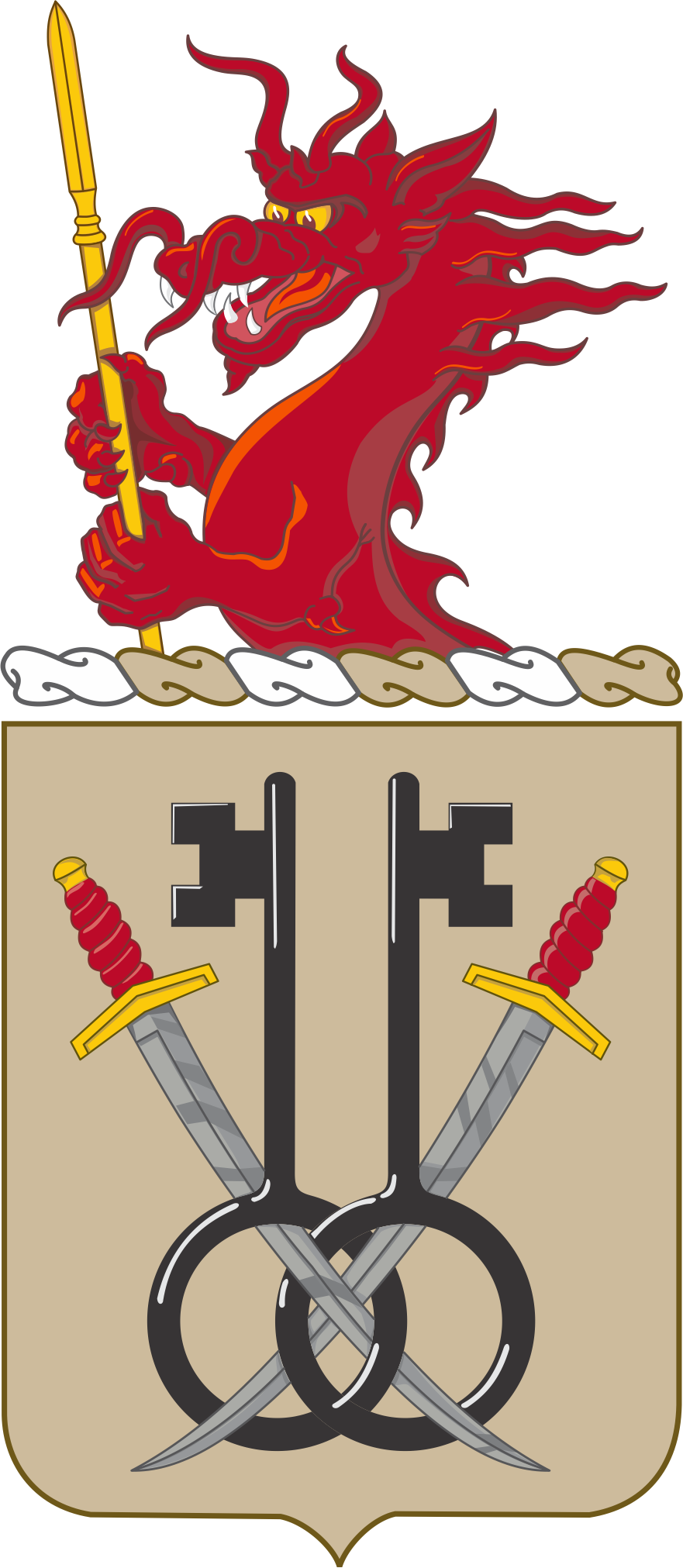
225th Brigade Support Battalion
"Warrior Support"

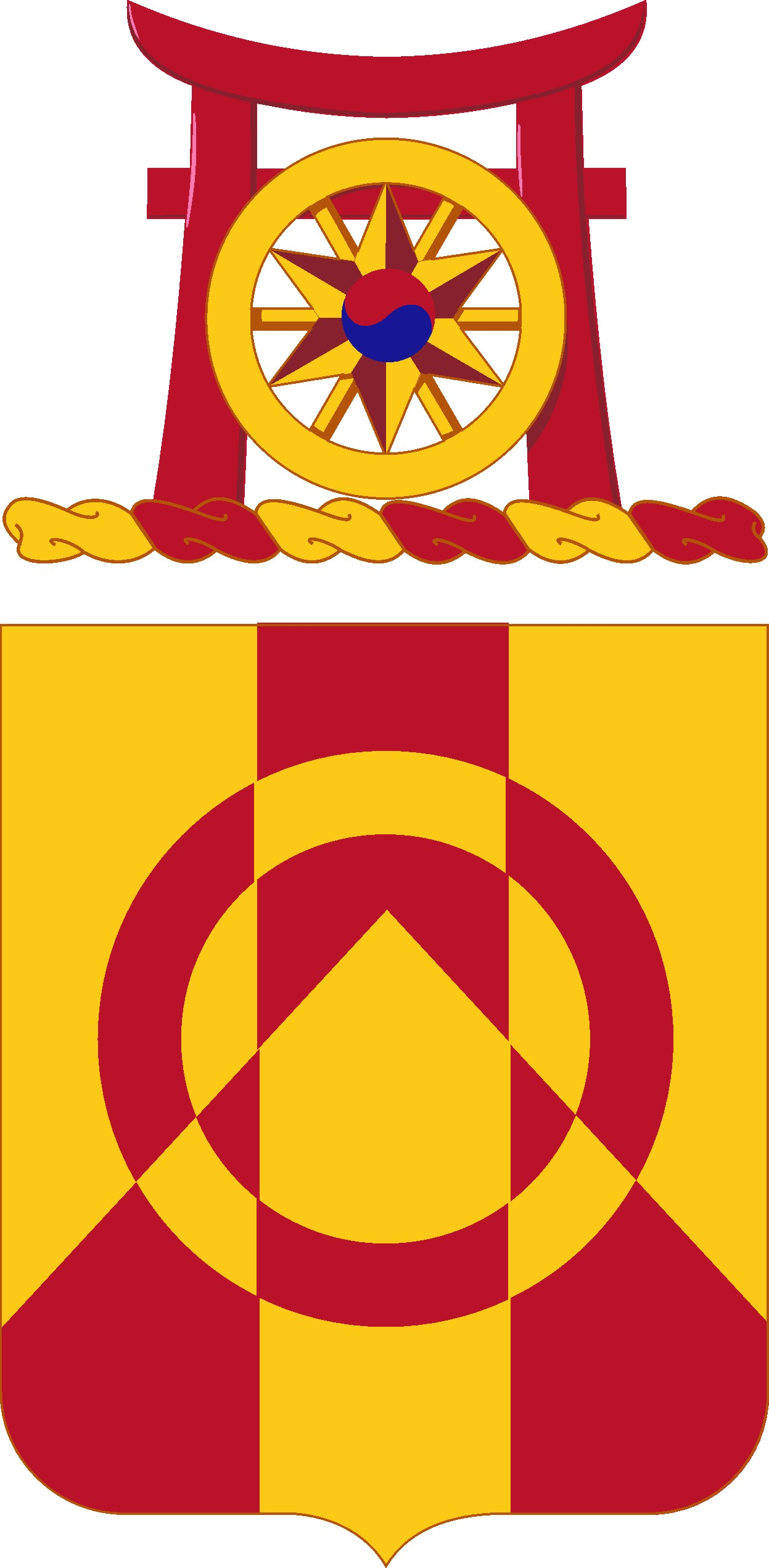
296th Brigade Support Battalion
"Frontline Support"

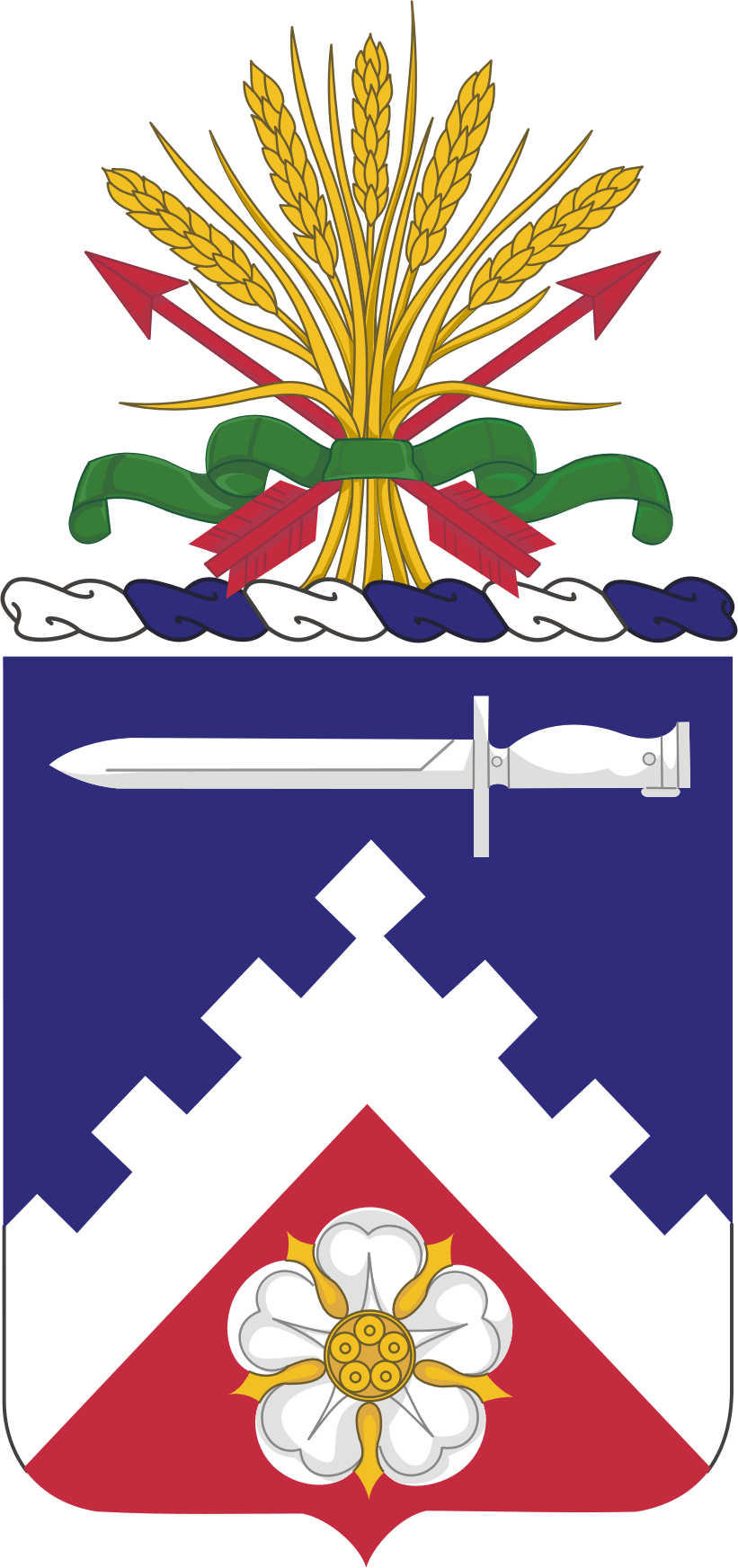
296th Brigade Support Battalion
"On Call To Serve"

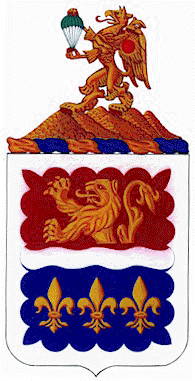
407th Forward Support Battalion
"Supply is Strength"

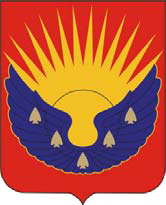
412th Aviation Support Battalion
"Professionals - Always!"

449th Support Battalion
"Fix Forward"

526th Brigade Support Battalion

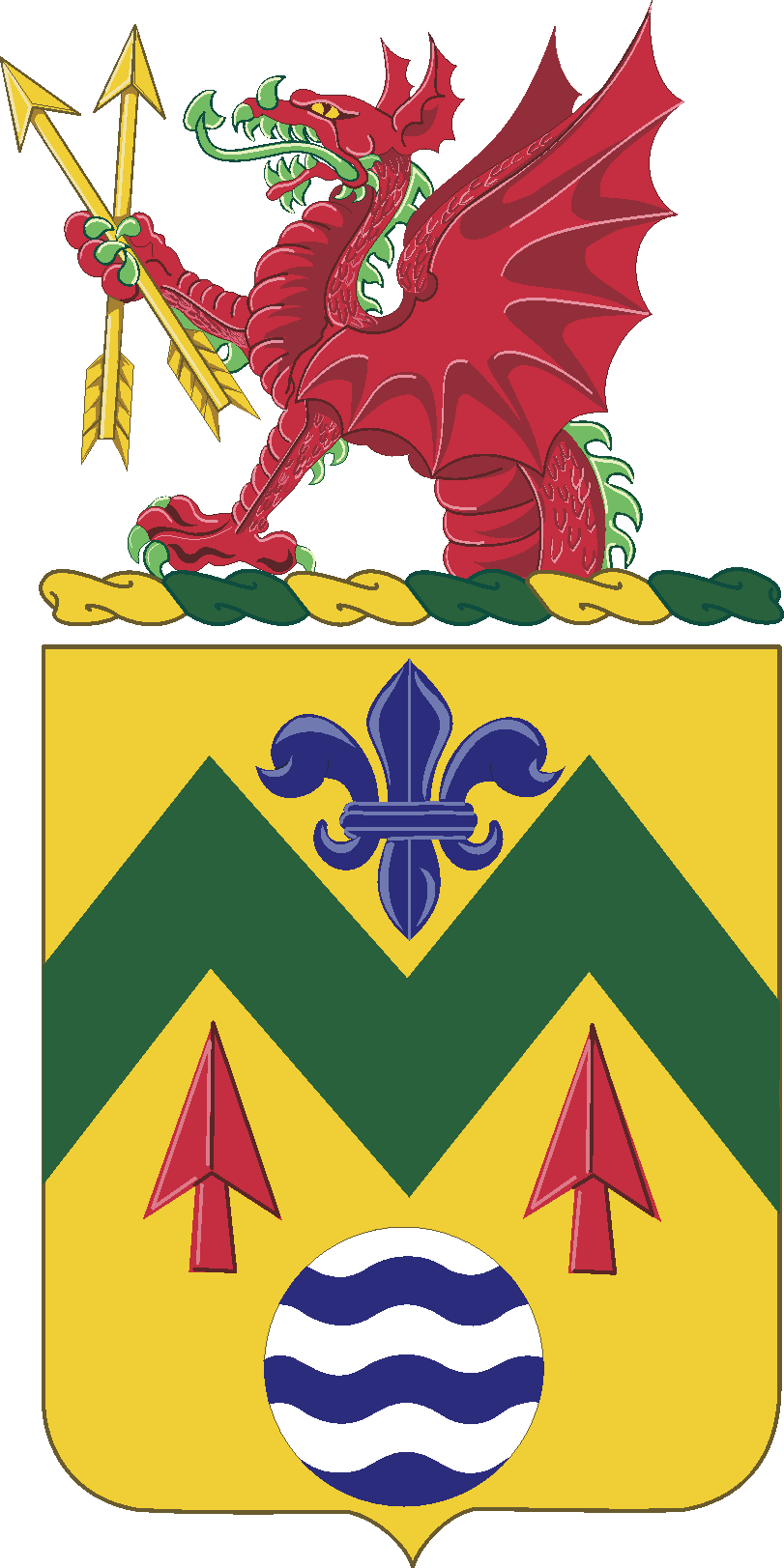
528th Support Battalion

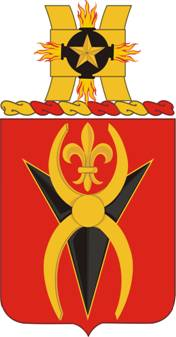
589th Support Battalion

636th Support Battalion
"Support Forward"

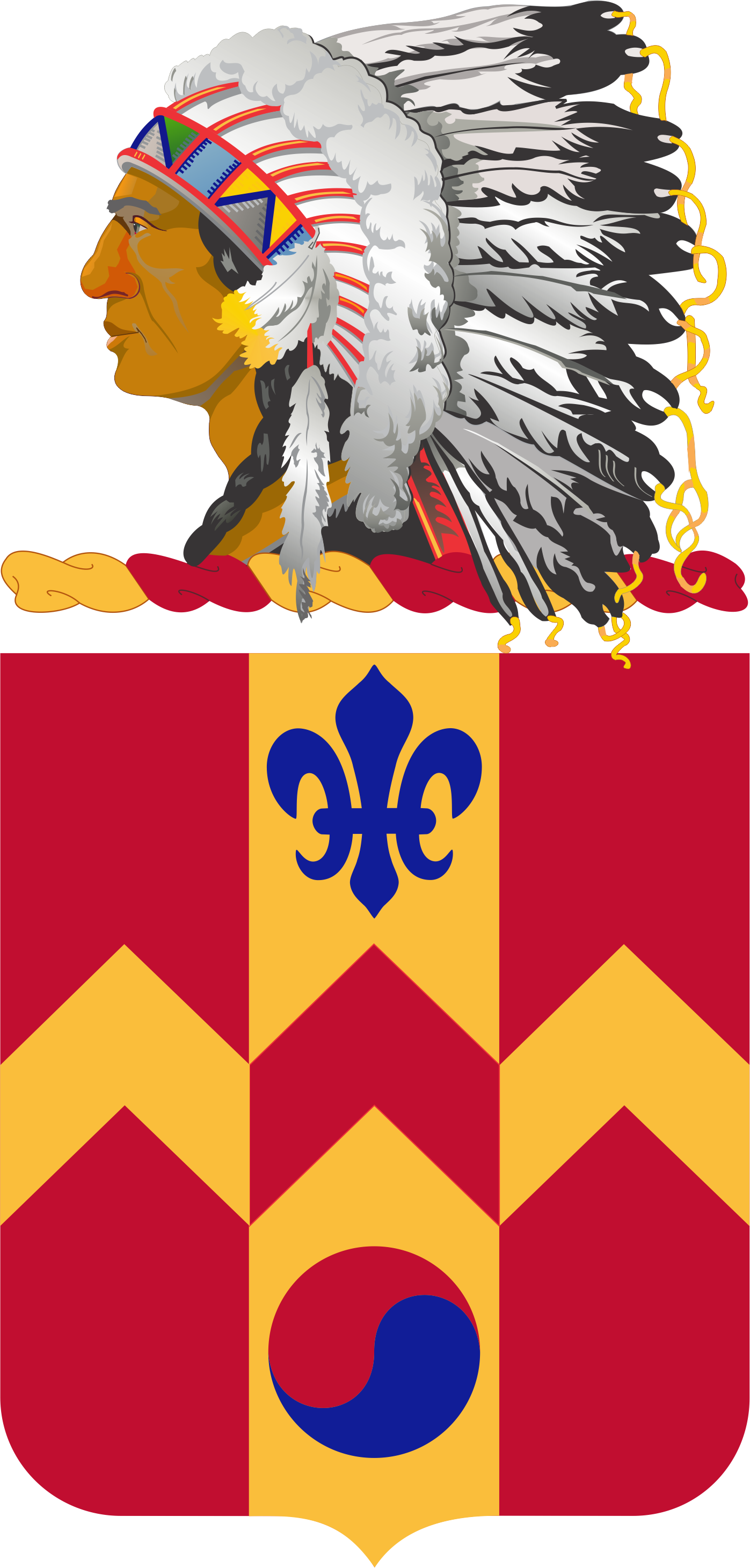
700th Brigade Support Battalion
"Tradition, Pride, Support"

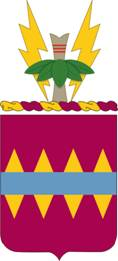
725th Support Battalion
"Service To The Line"

949th Support Battalion
"Pride of Ordinance"

== Non-specified regiments ==
49th Finance Battalion
"A Texas Tradition"

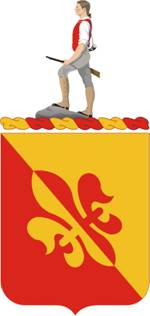
80th Regiment
"Nunc Ut Olim" (Now As Before)

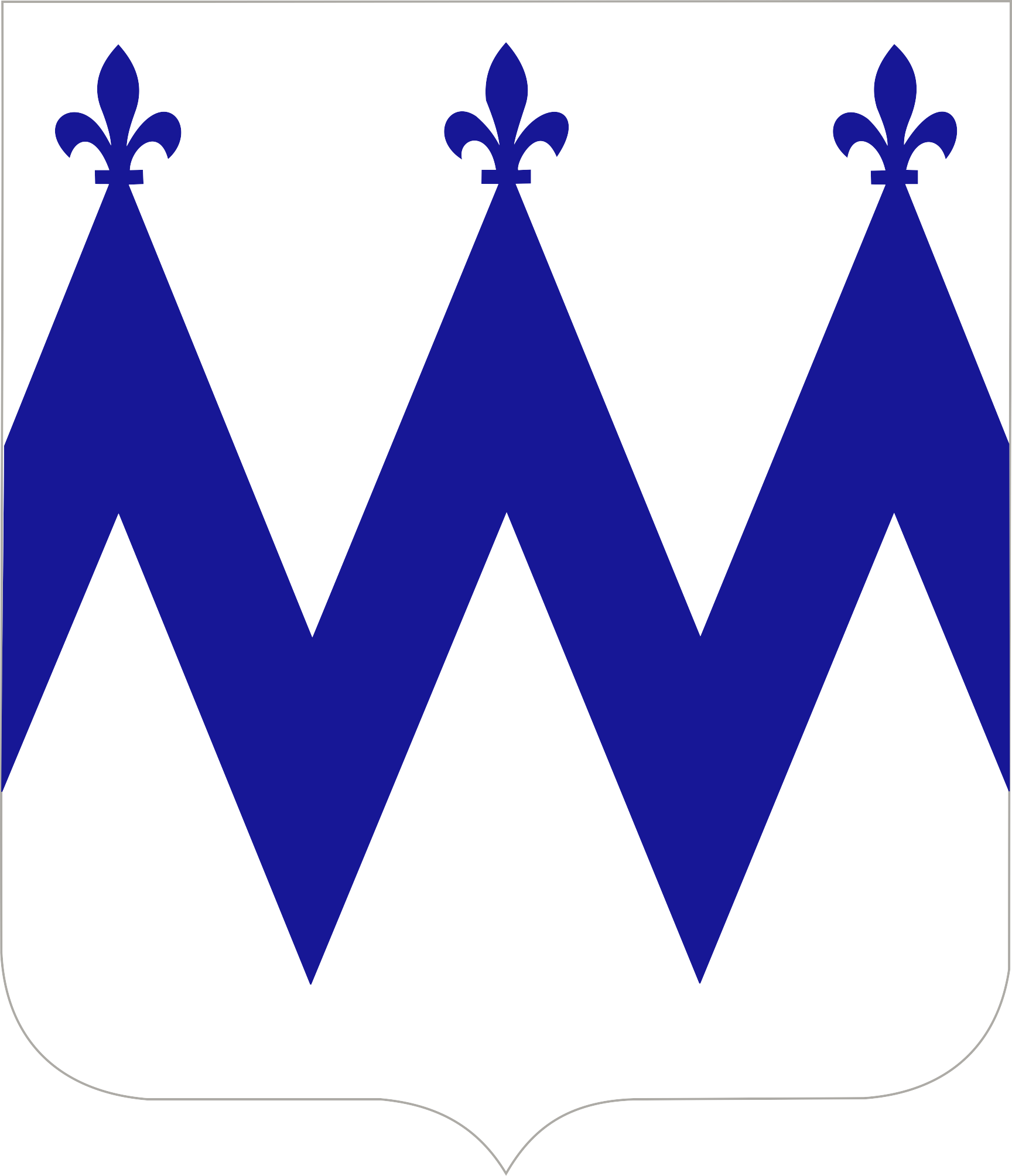
86th Infantry
"Courage and Dependability"

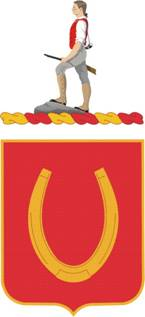
100th Regiment
(formerly 375th Field Artillery Regiment)
"Sic Jurat Transcendere Montes" (Thus He Swears To Cross The Mountains)

111th Medical Battalion
"Dedicated And Diligent"

149th Personnel Services Battalion
"Supporting The Soldier"

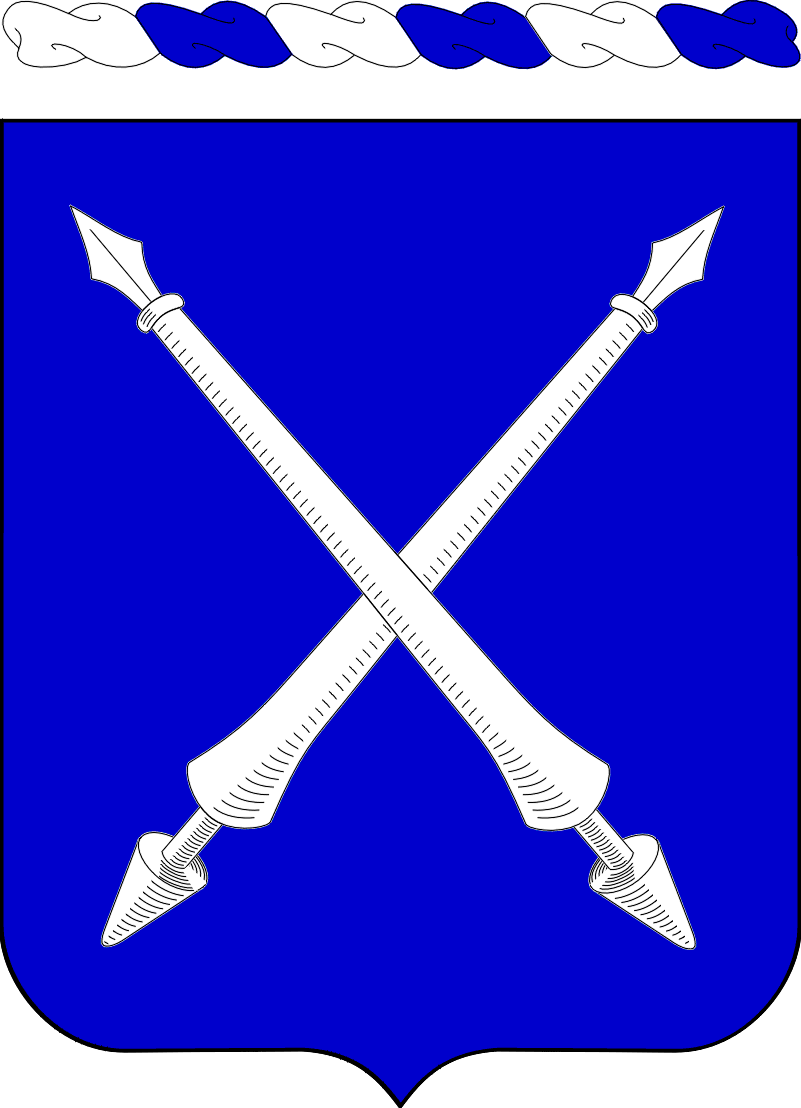
154th Regiment
(formerly 154th Infantry Regiment)
"Firm To My Trust"

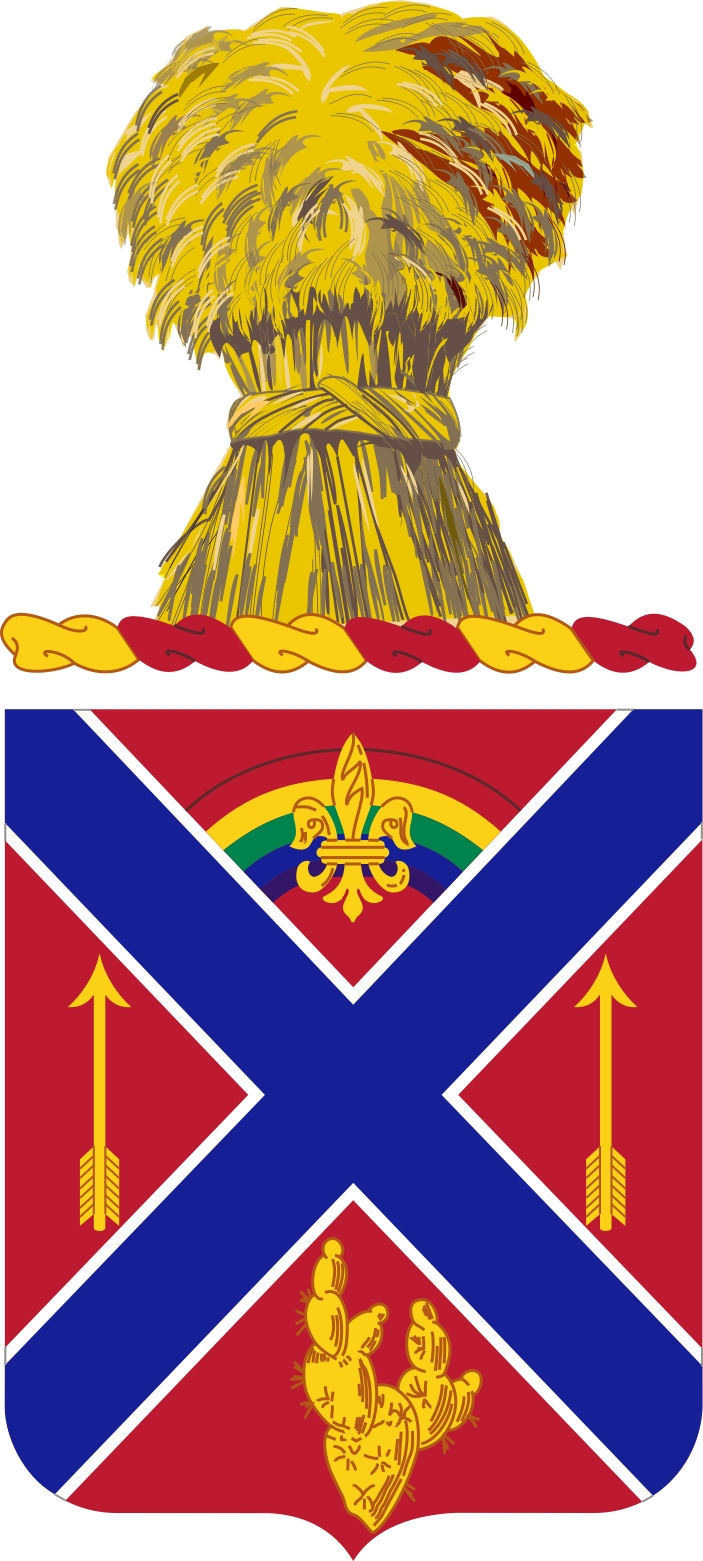
175th Regiment
(formerly 175th Field Artillery Regiment)
"Animus Valet" (Courage Prevails)

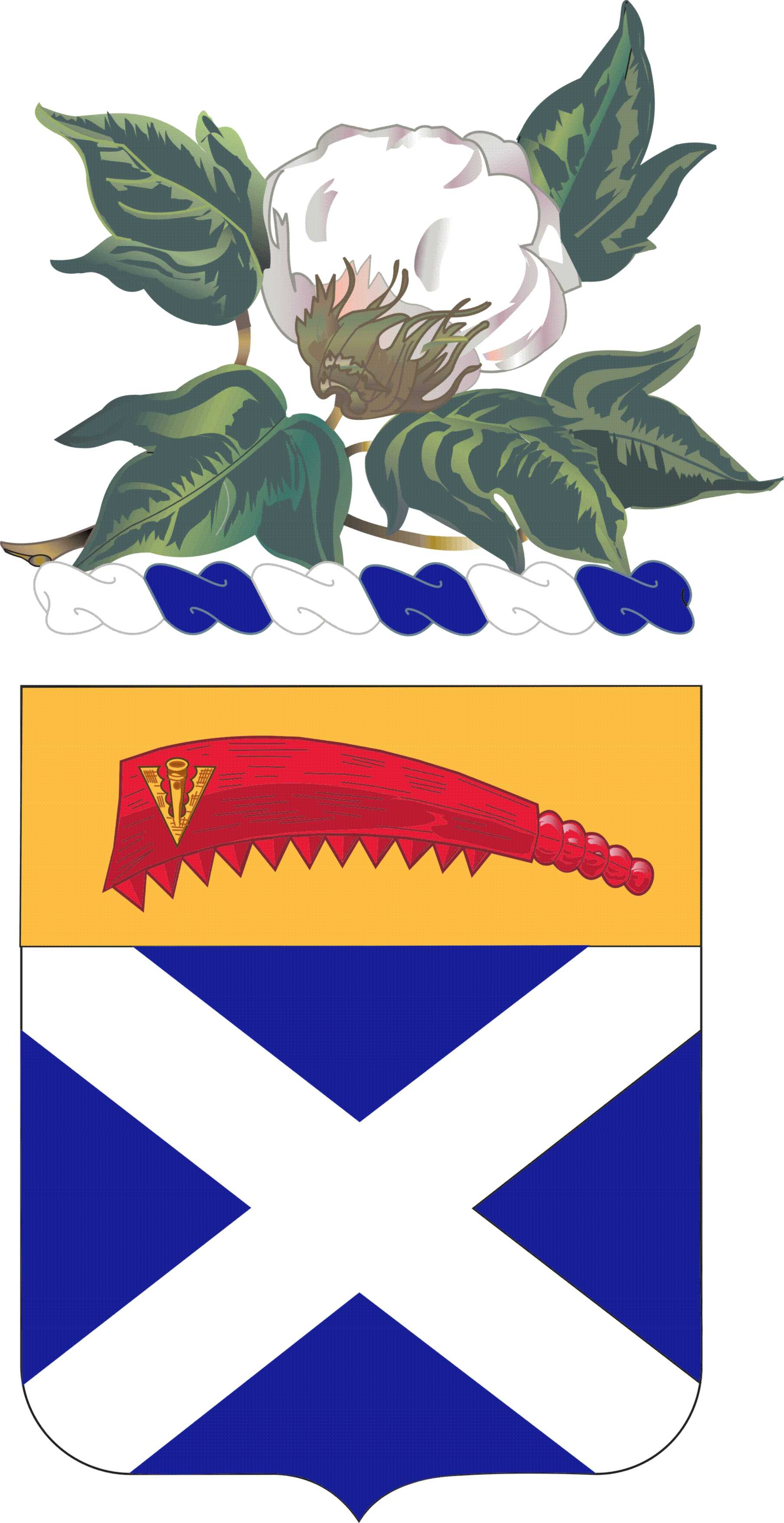
200th Regiment
(formerly 200th Infantry Regiment)
"Crede et vince" (Believe And Conquer)

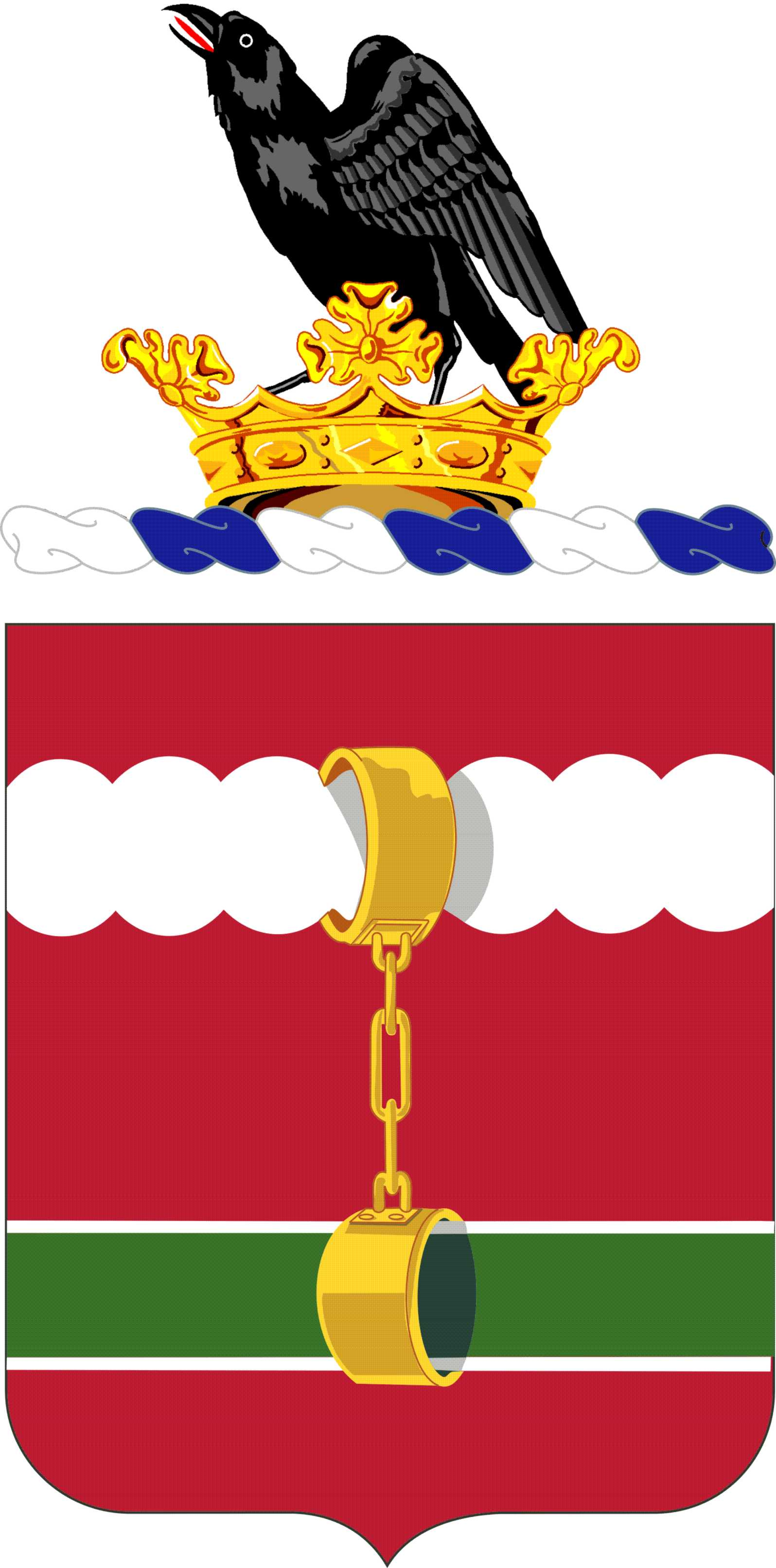
205th Regiment
(formerly 205th Air Defense Regiment)
"Res Verae" (Data Correct)

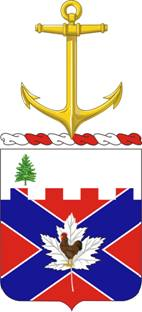
243rd Regiment
(formerly 243rd Coast Artillery Regiment)

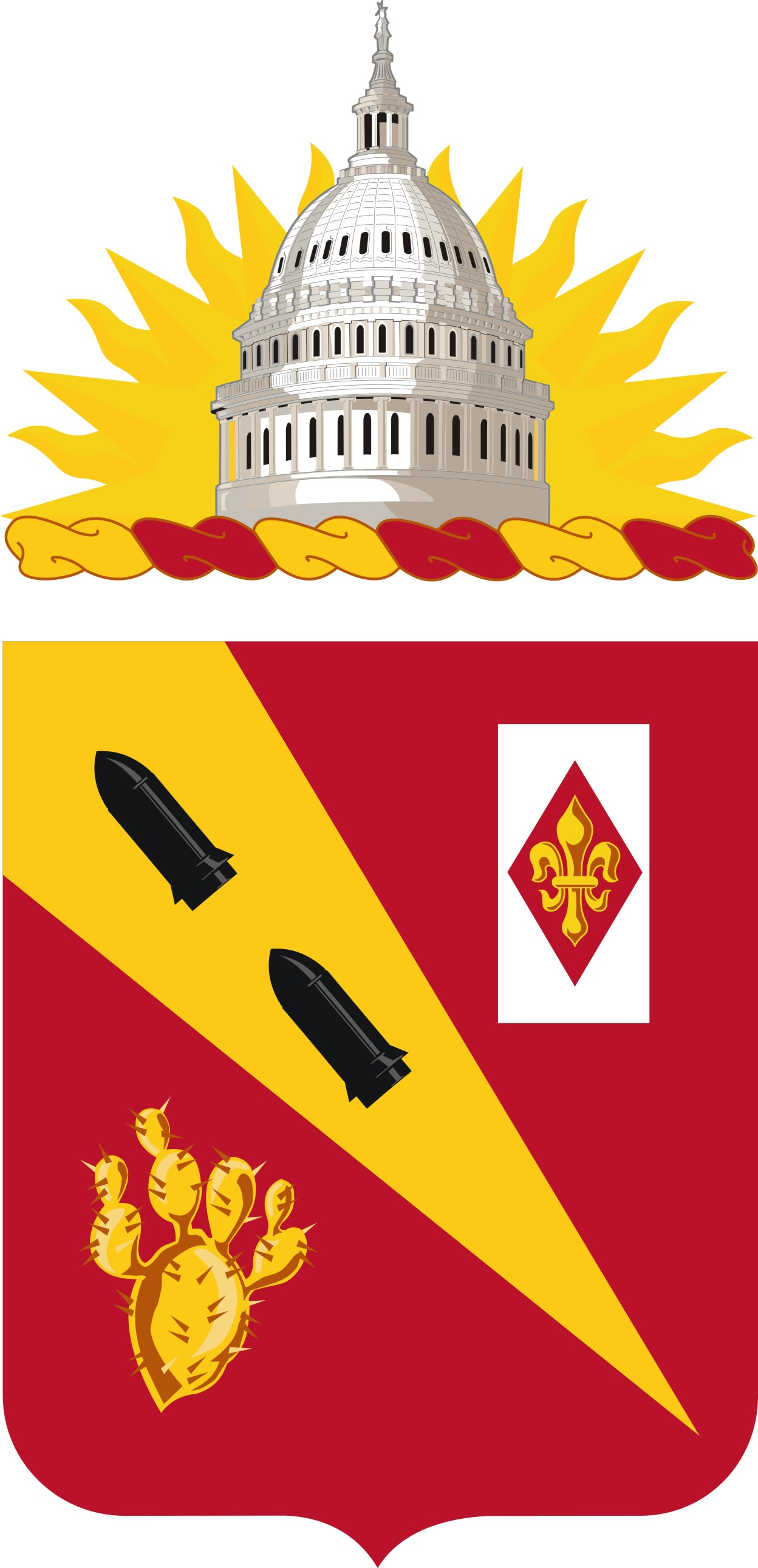
260th Regiment
(formerly 260th Coast Artillery Regiment)
"Ferio, tego" (I Strike, I Defend)

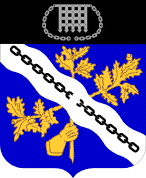
307th Regiment
(formerly 307th Infantry Regiment)
"Clear the Way"

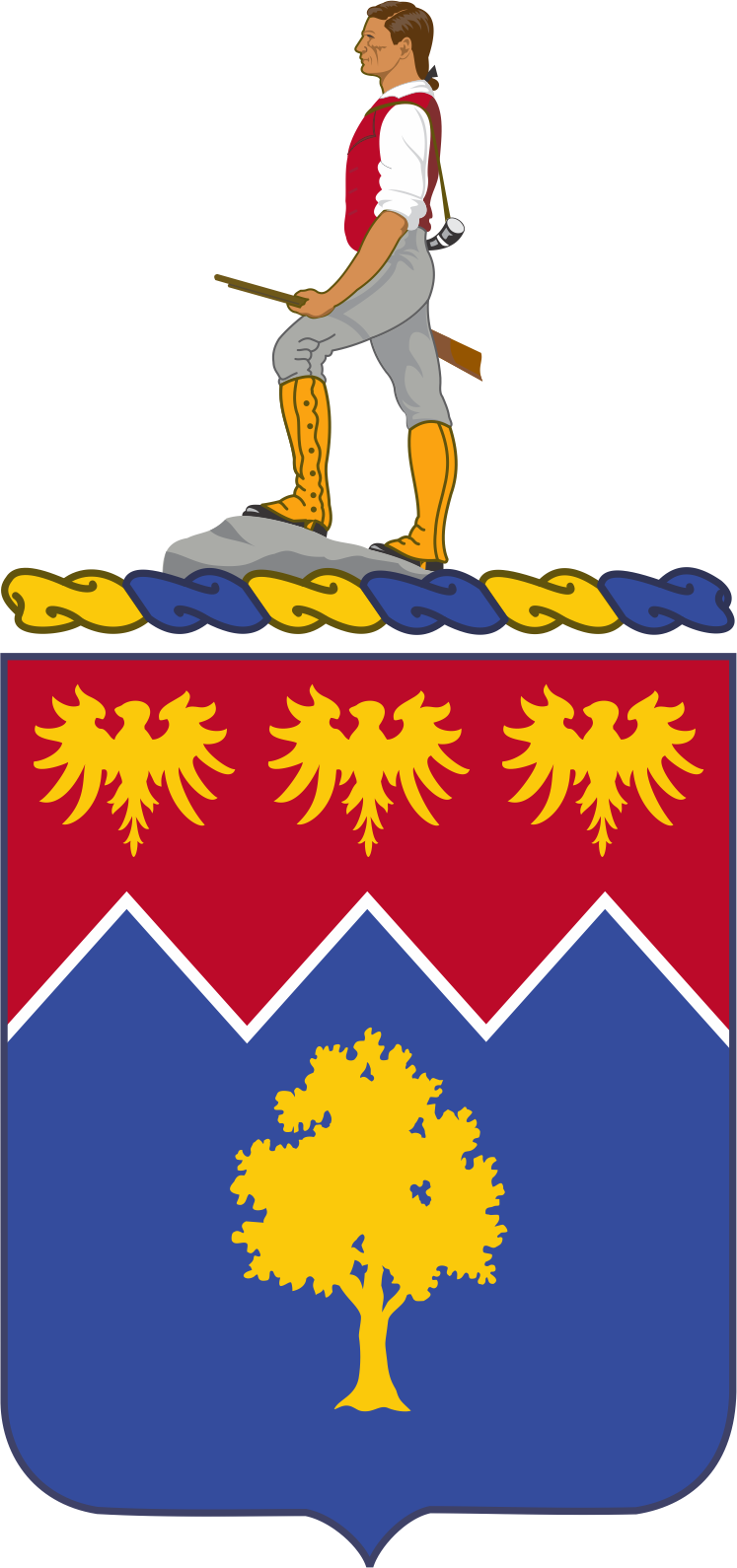
311th Regiment
(formerly 311th Infantry Regiment)
"Jamais Trop Tard" (Never Too Late)

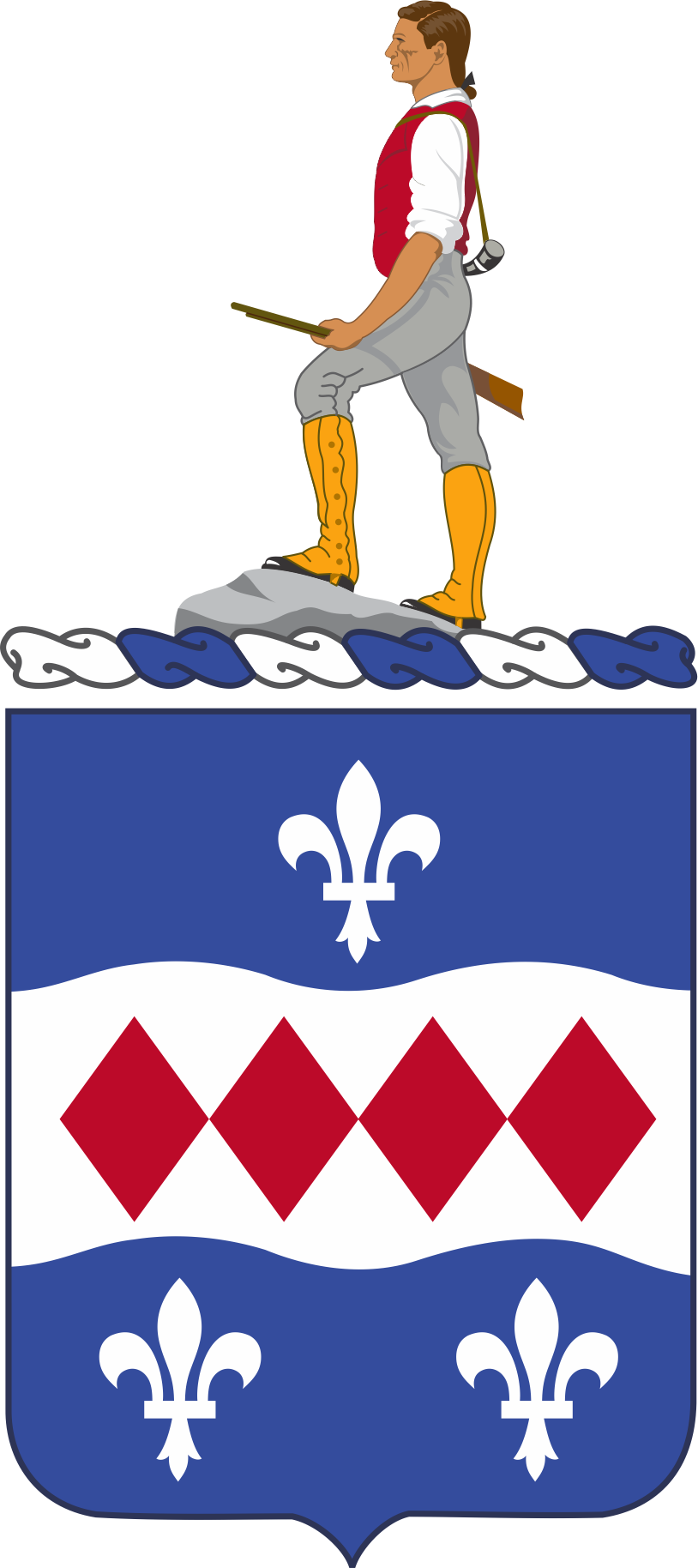
312th Regiment
(formerly 312th Infantry Regiment)
"Au Feu Toujours" (Always at the Fire)

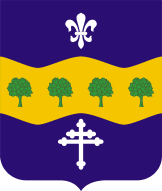
315th Regiment
(formerly 315th Infantry Regiment)
"Qui Me Tangit Paenitebit" (He who touches me will repent)

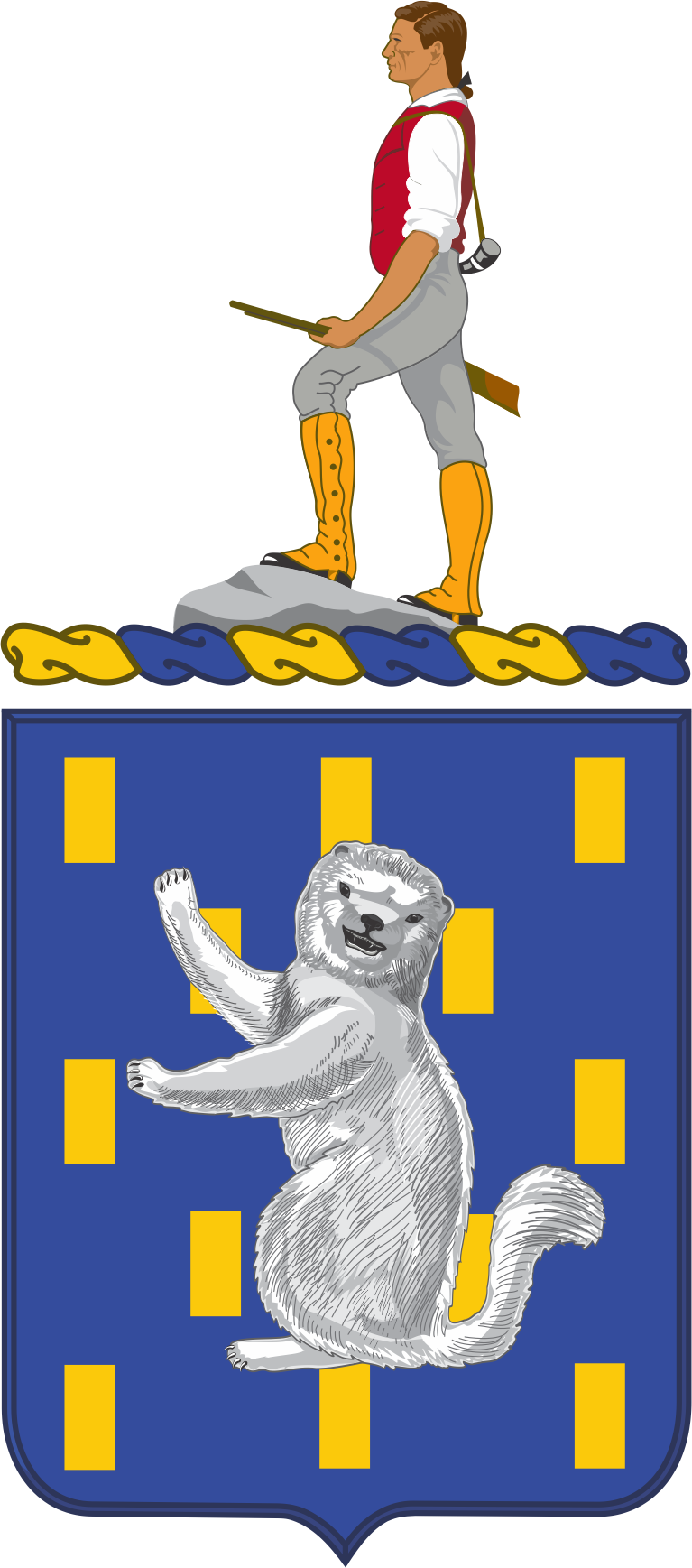
337th Regiment
"Vis et Virtus" (Strength and Courage)

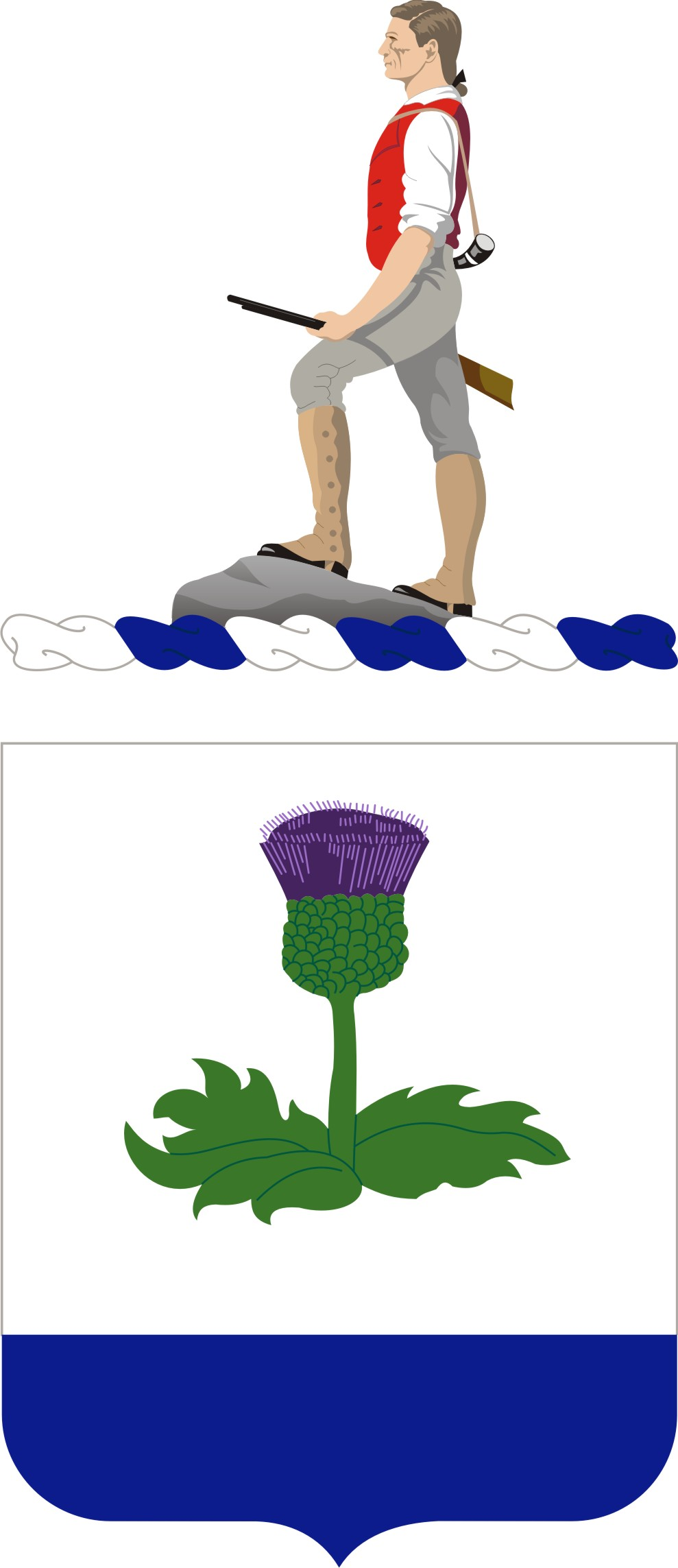
338th Regiment
"Marchons" (March On)

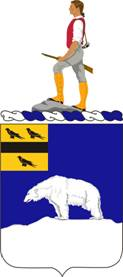
339th Regiment
(formerly 339th Infantry Regiment)

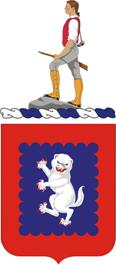
340th Regiment
"Forward"

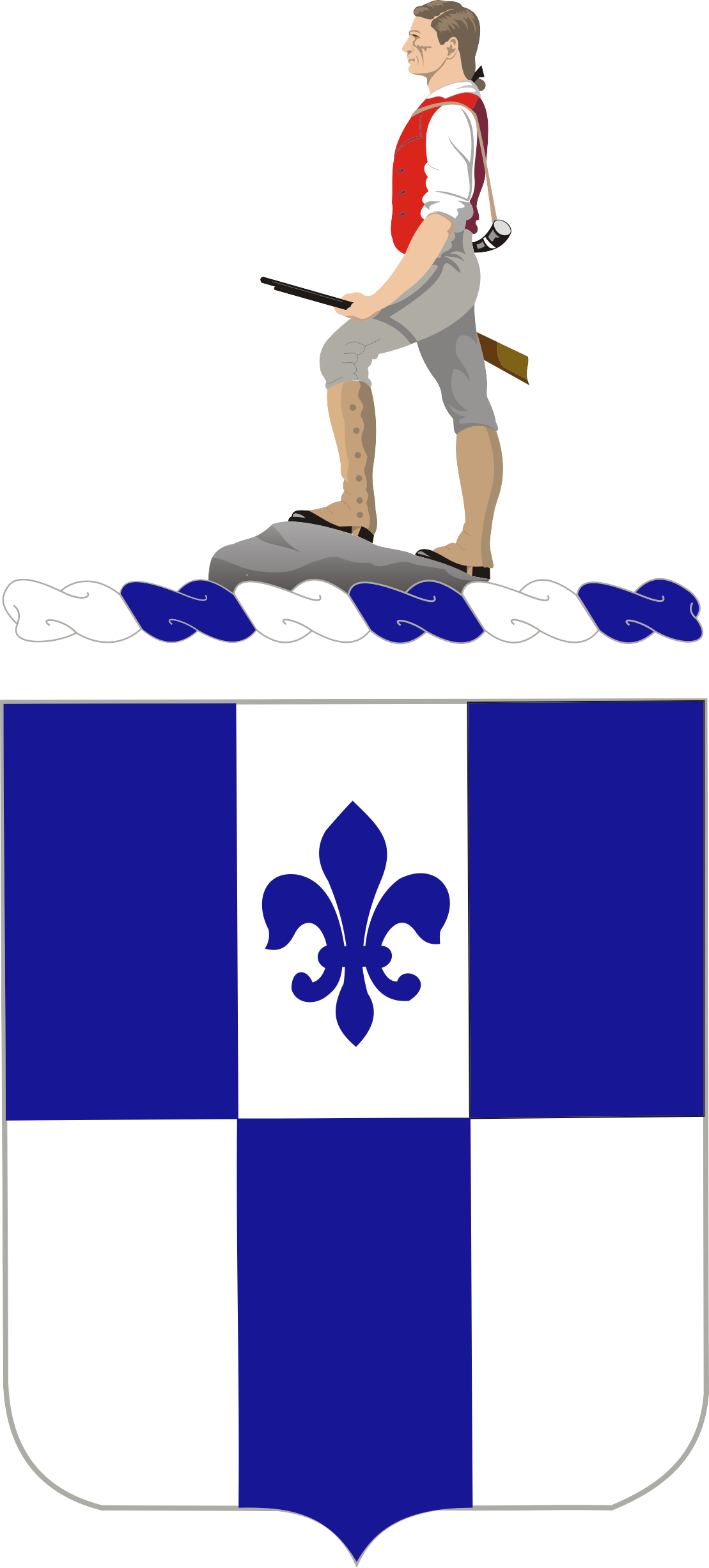
345th Regiment
"Invictus" (Unconquerable)

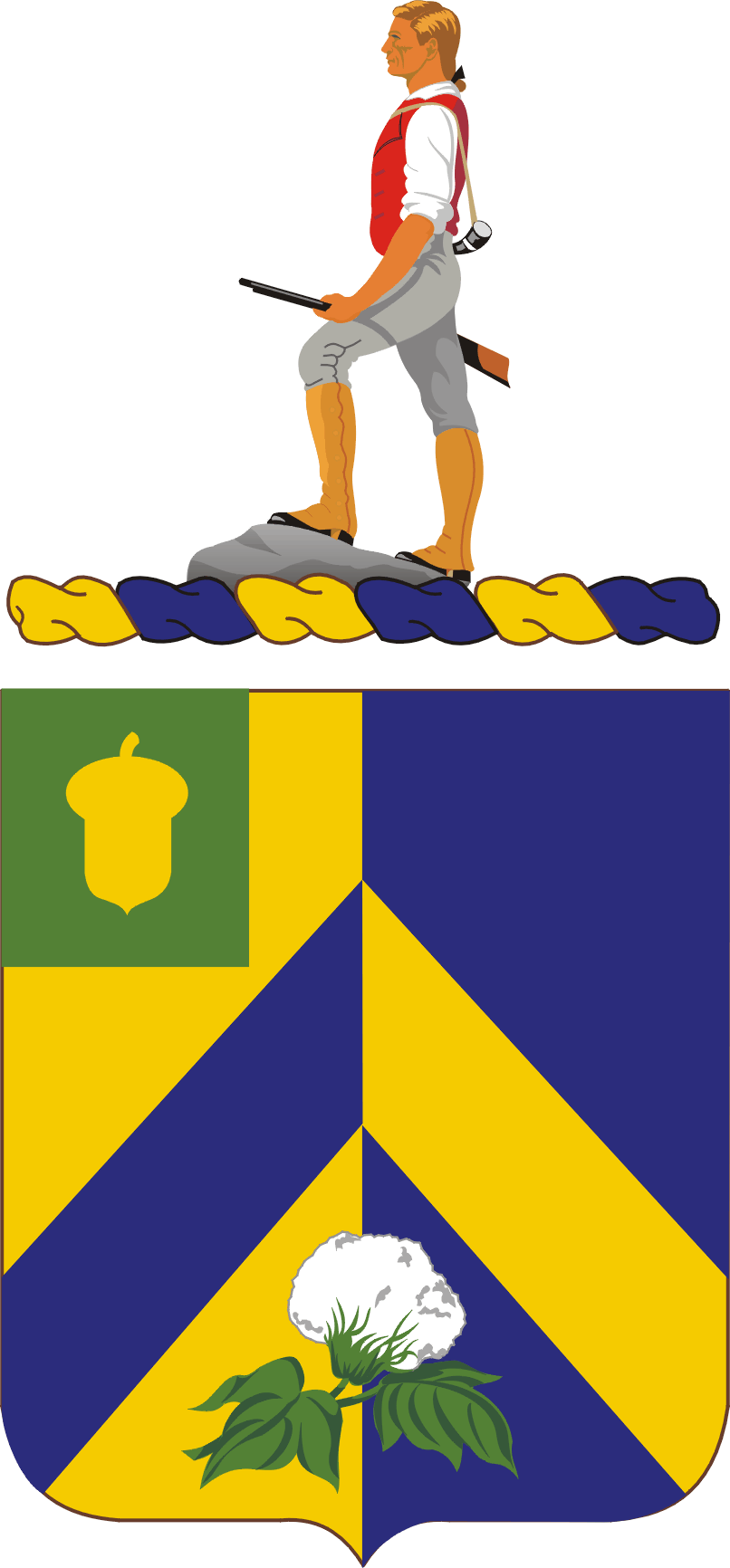
346th Regiment
"Semper Et Ubique Fidelis" (Always and Everywhere Faithful)

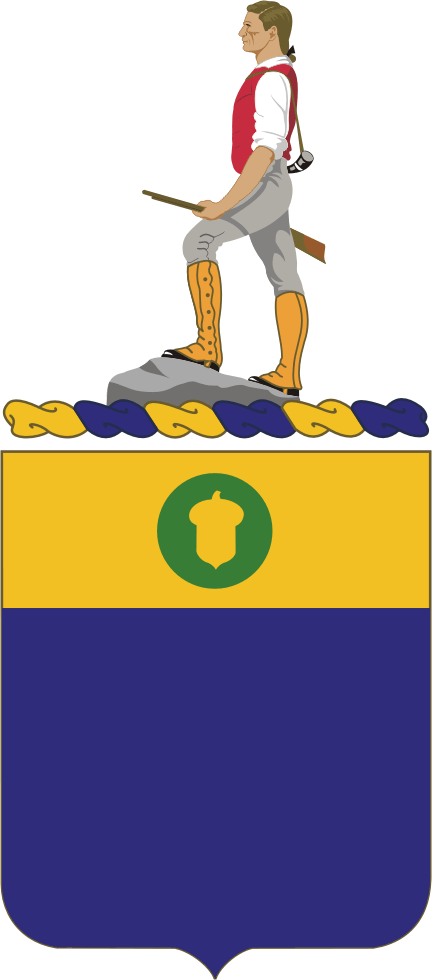
347th Regiment
"Dare Your Best"

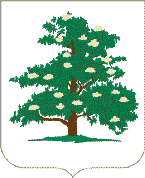
348th Regiment
(formerly 348th Infantry Regiment)
"AnLI yamojmikma KAMASSA" (Sincerity and Strength)

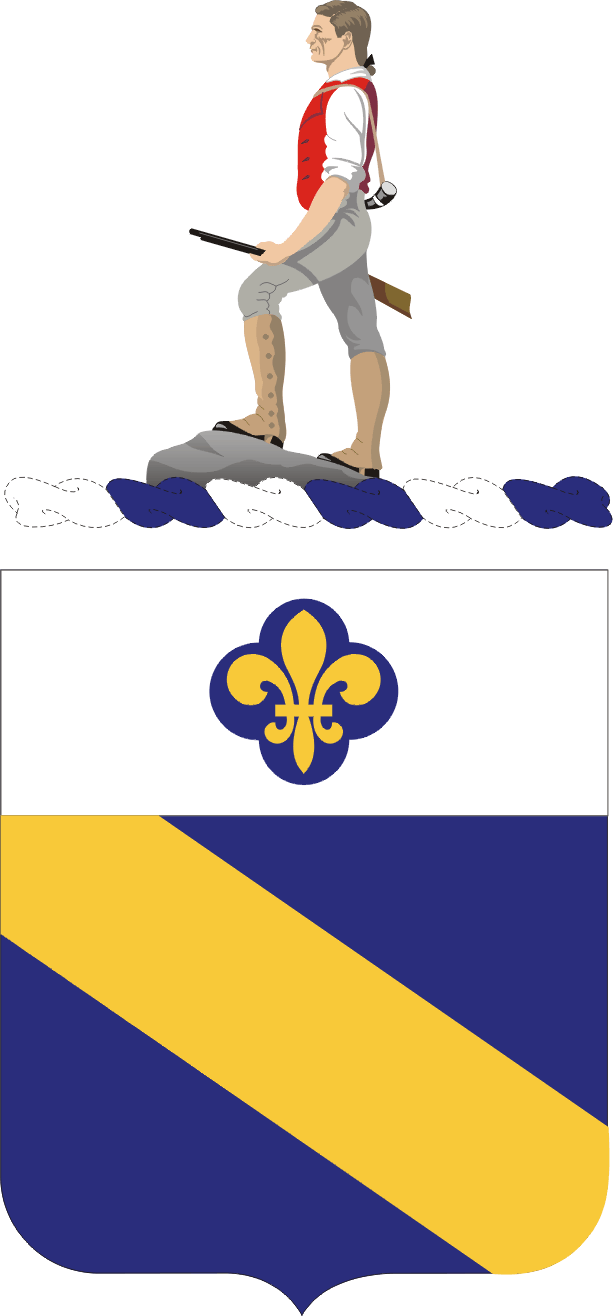
349th Regiment
"Liberty and Rights"

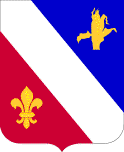
350th Regiment
"Fidelity and Service"

351st Regiment
(formerly 351st Infantry Regiment)
"Toujours Prêt" (Always Ready)

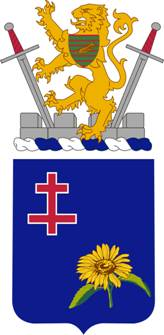
353rd Regiment
(formerly 353rd Infantry Regiment)
"To the Stars Through Difficulties"

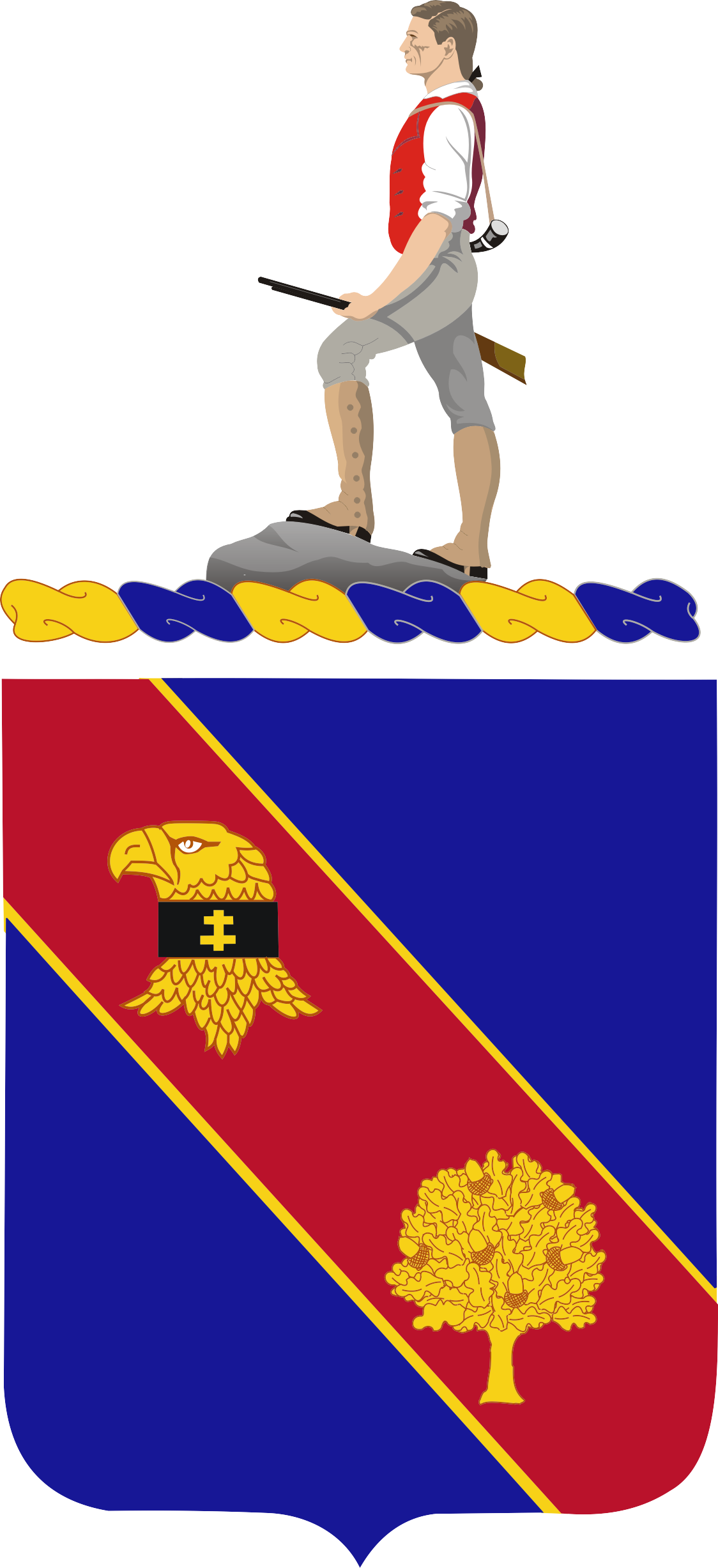
354th Regiment
(formerly 354th Infantry Regiment)
"Wright, Wood, Winn"

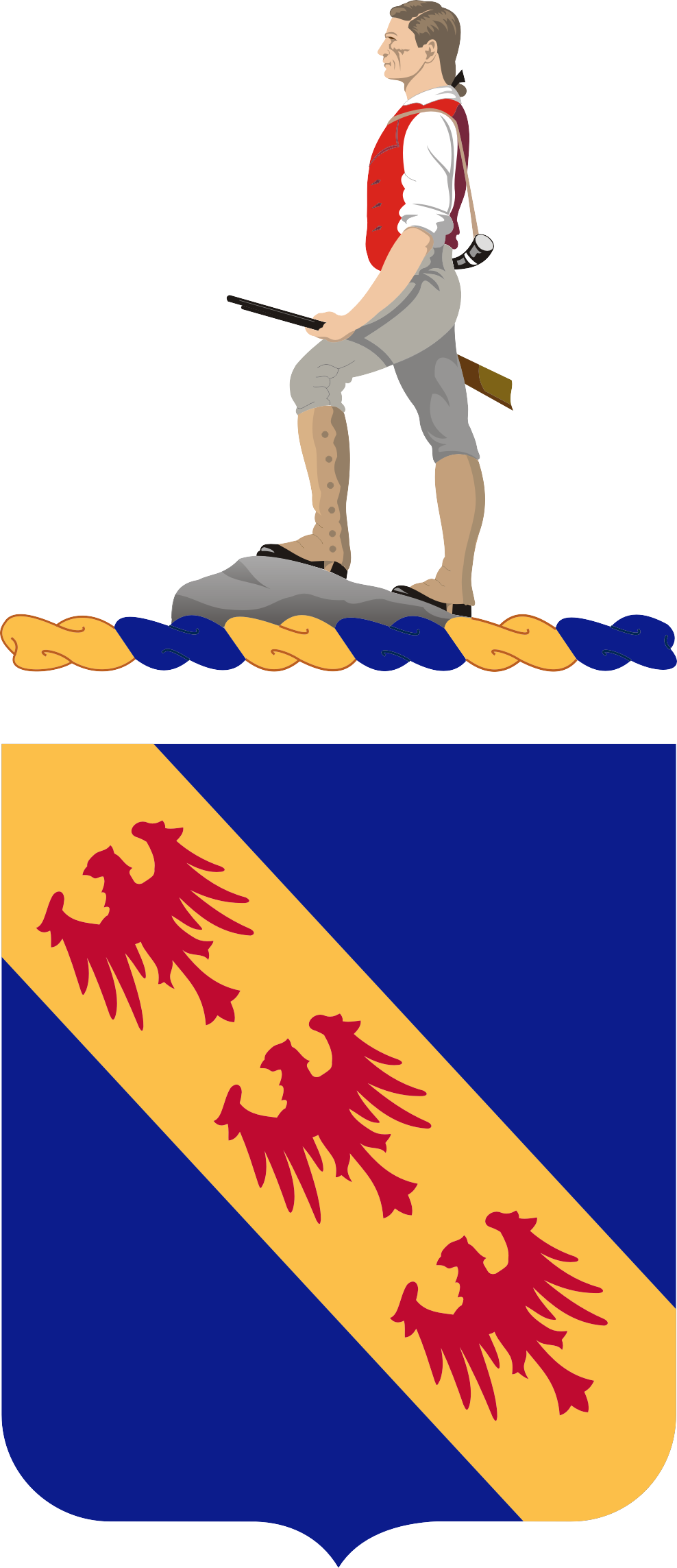
355th Regiment
"Fidem Praestabimus" (We Will Keep the Faith)

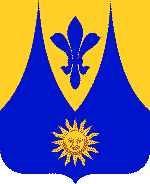
356th Regiment
"Boutze en Avant" (Push Forward)

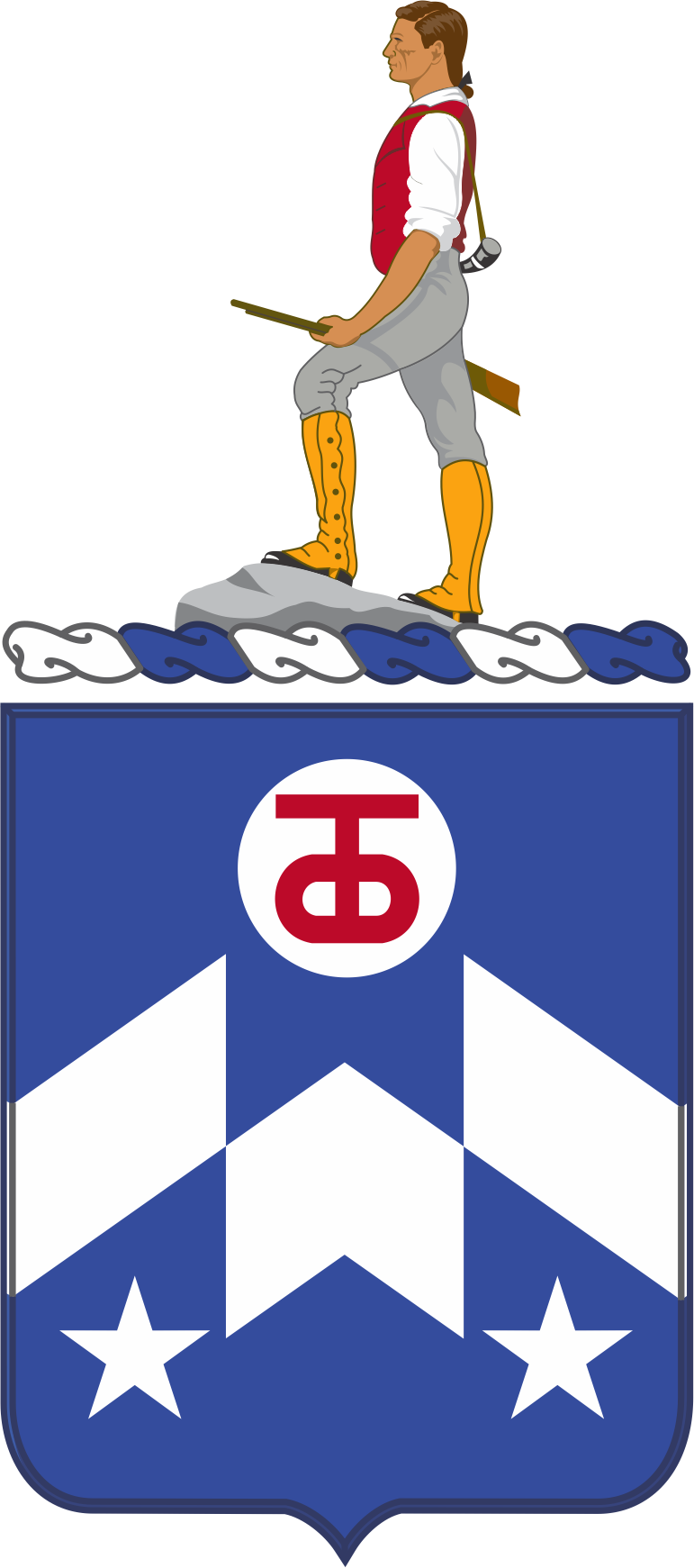
357th Regiment
"Siempre Alerta" (Always on Alert)

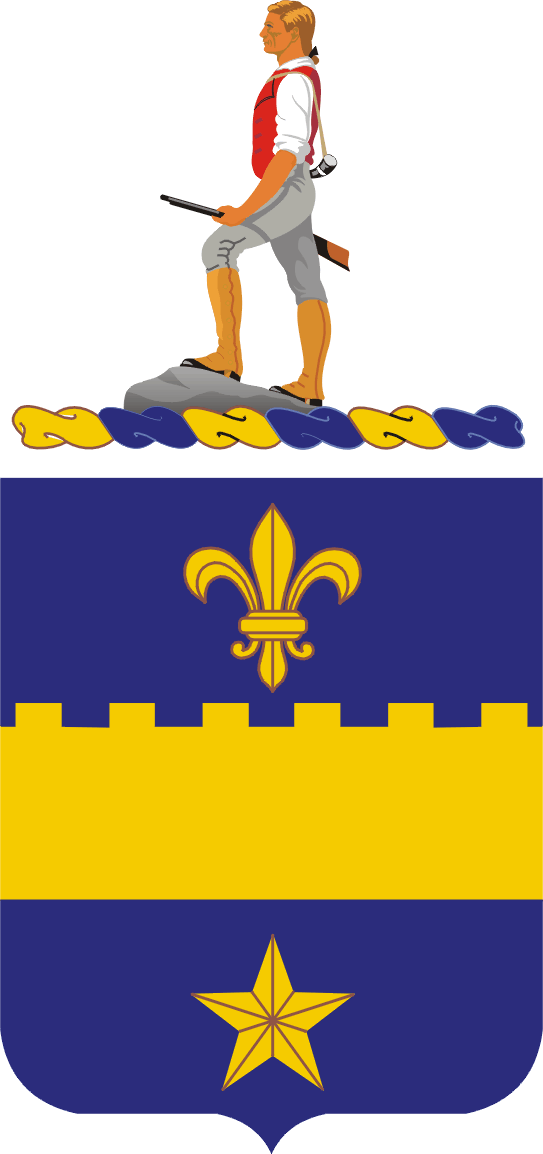
358th Regiment
"Peragimus" (We Accomplish)

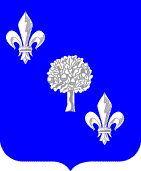
359th Regiment
"Carry On"

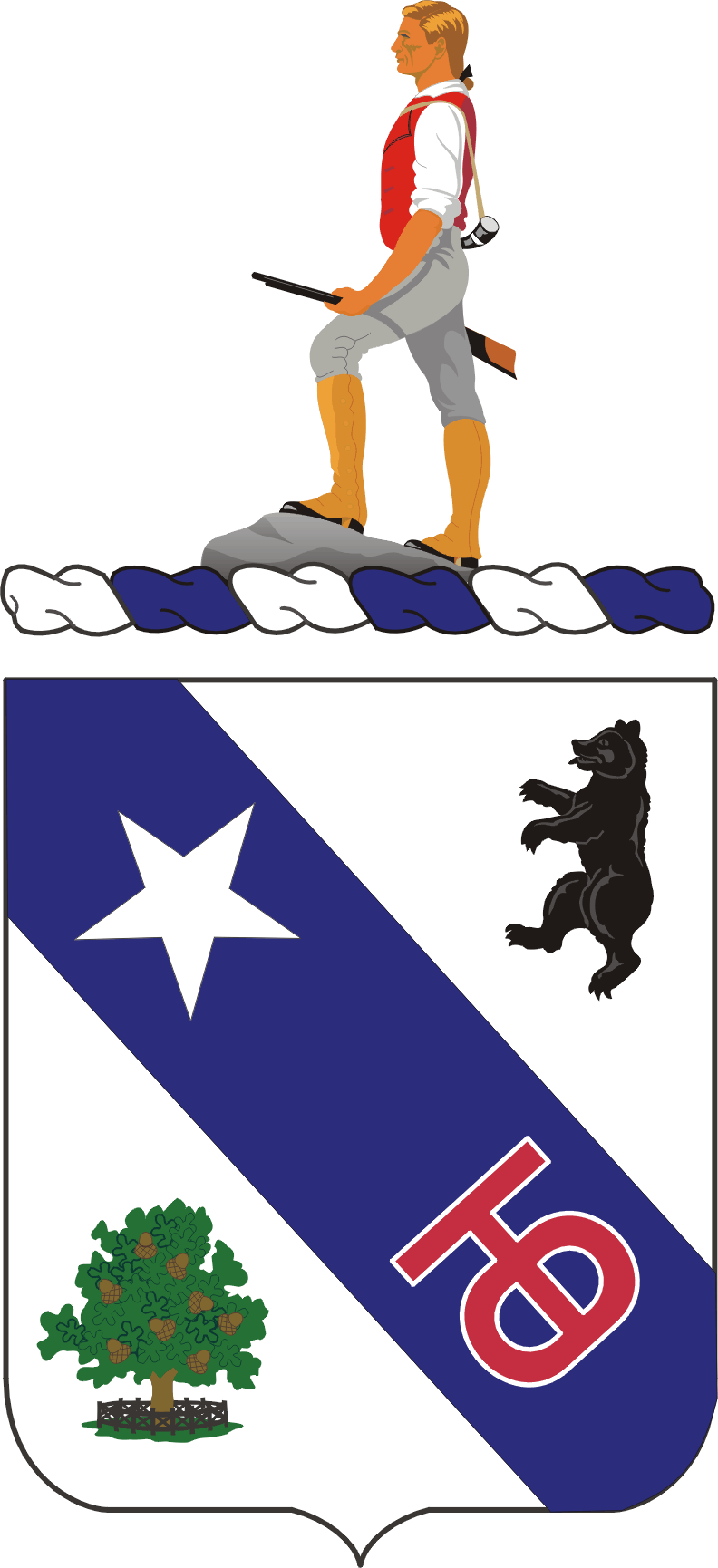
360th Infantry
"Toujours Fidèle" (Always Faithful)

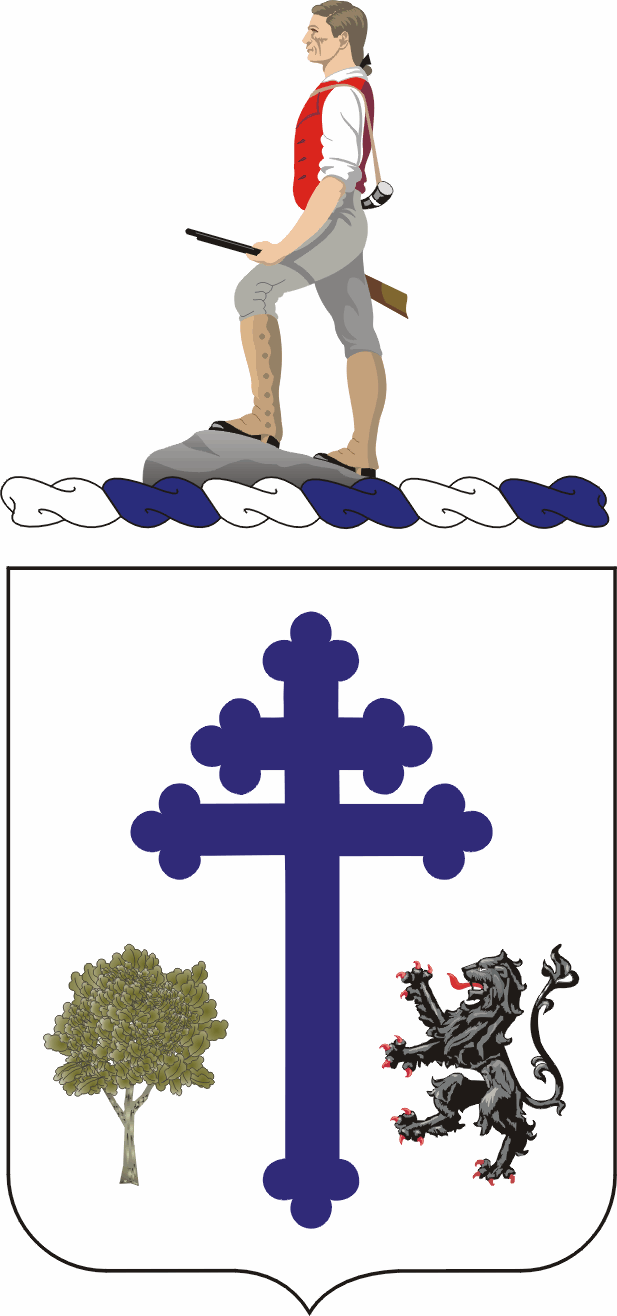
361st Regiment
"Ducit amor patriae" (Led by Love of Country)

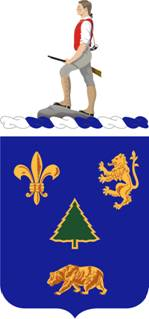
362nd Regiment
"Arma Tuentur Pacem" (Arms Are the Guardian of Peace)

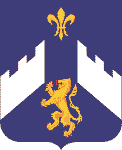
363rd Regiment
(formerly 363rd Infantry Regiment)
"We Do"

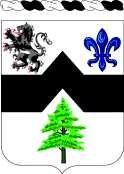
364th Regiment
(formerly 364th Coast Artillery Regiment)
"Semper Paratus" (Always Ready)

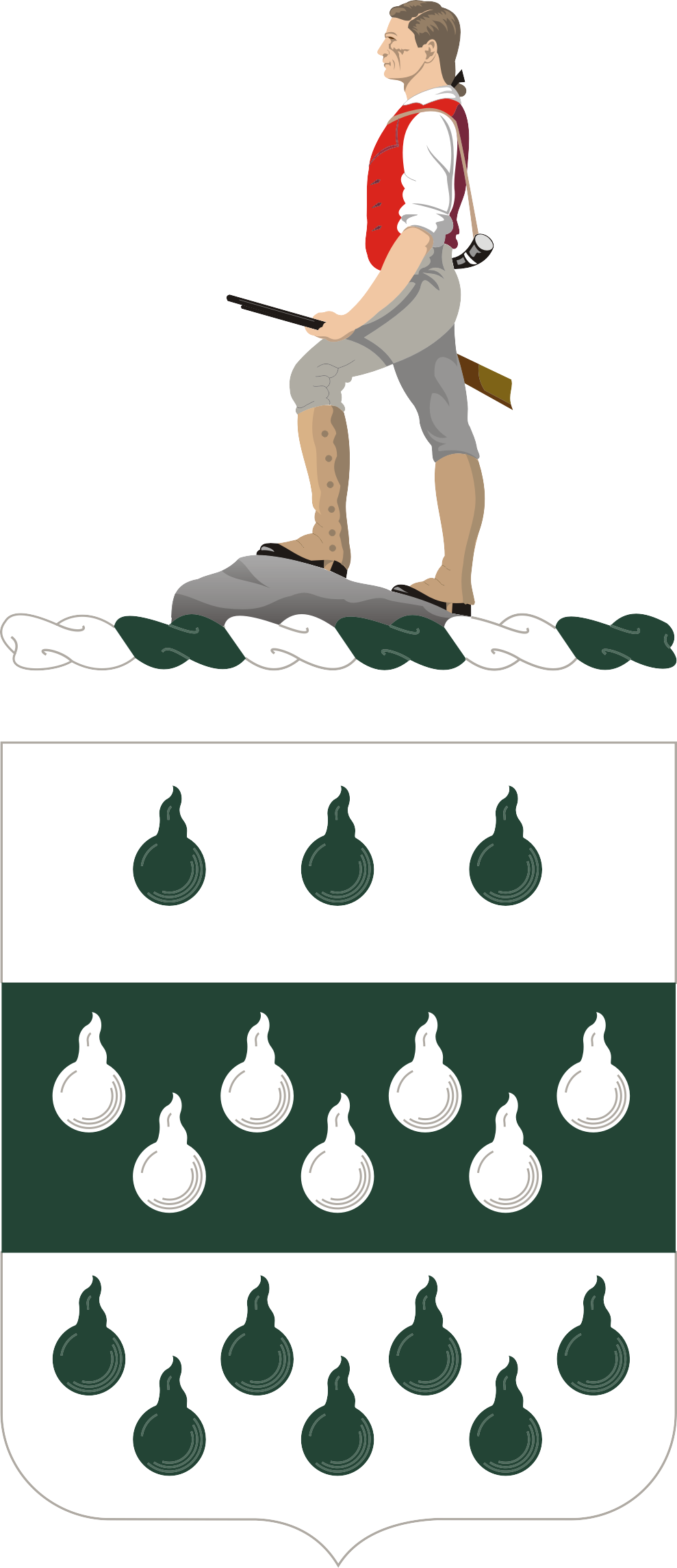
377th Regiment
(formerly 377th Infantry Regiment)
"NI GA DA E SA SDI" (Onward)

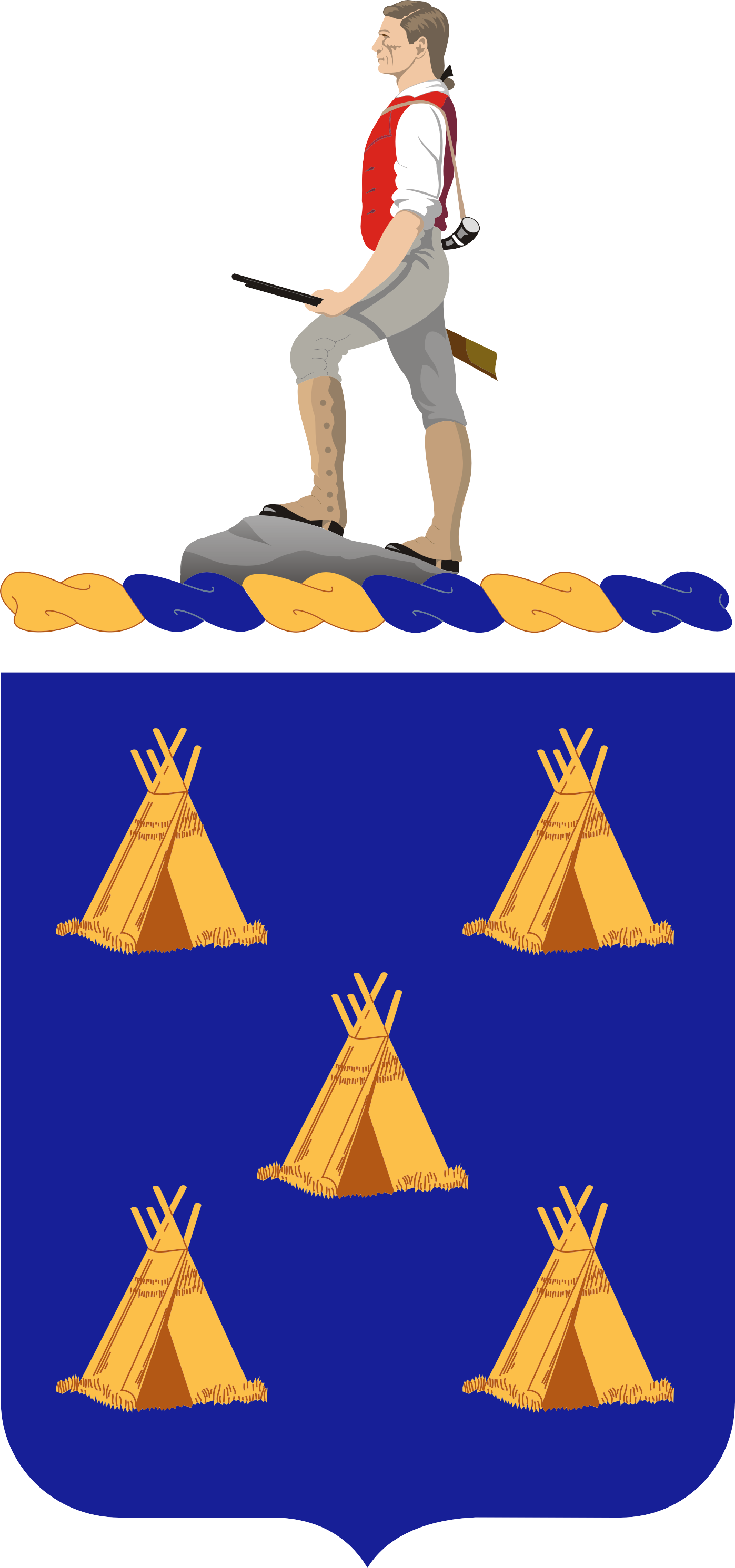
378th Regiment
(formerly 378th Infantry Regiment)
"Hikia Kallo" (Stand Firm)

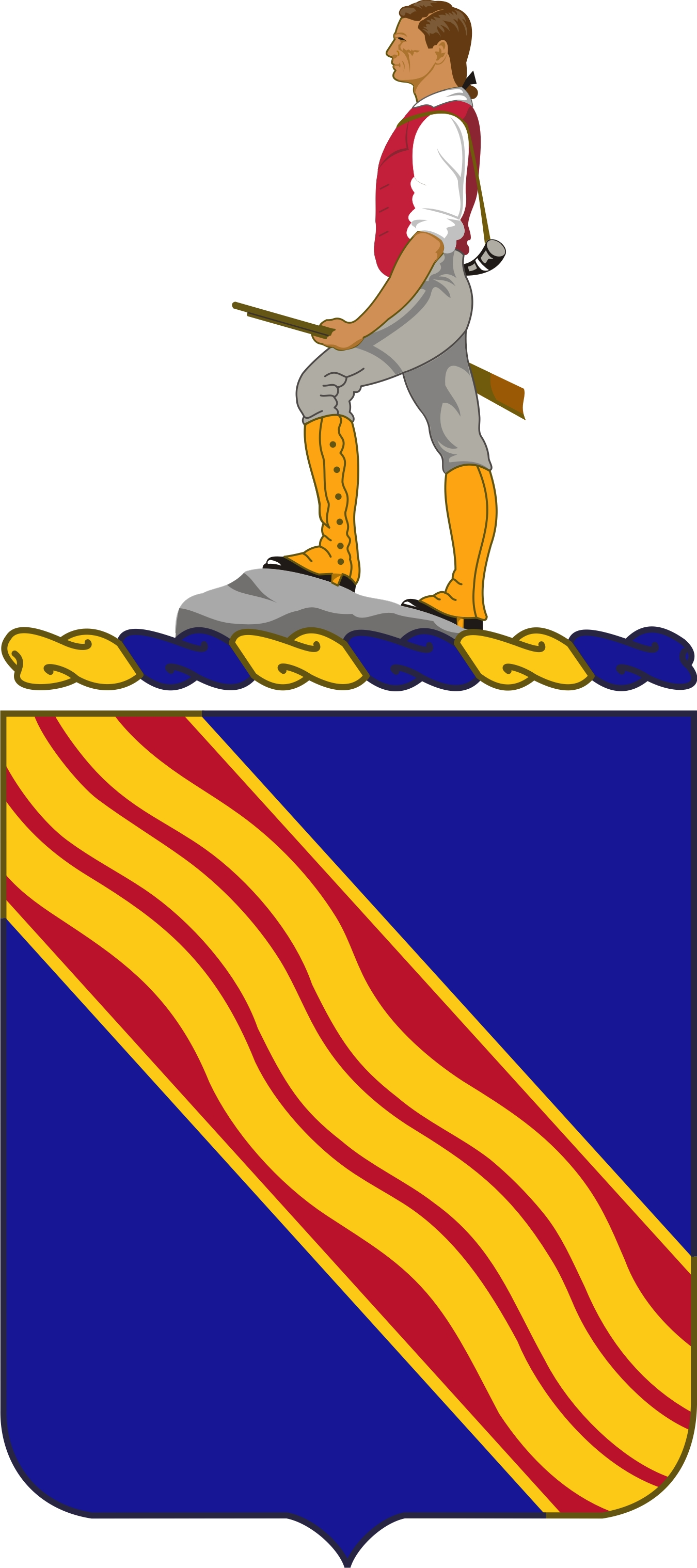
379th Regiment
(formerly 379th Infantry Regiment)
"Ad finem" (To The End)

381st Regiment
(formerly 381st Infantry Regiment)
"Paratus et Vigilans" (Ready and Alert)

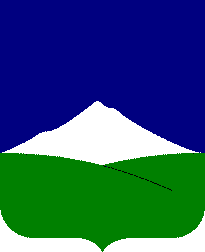
382nd Regiment
(formerly 382nd Infantry Regiment)
"We lead"

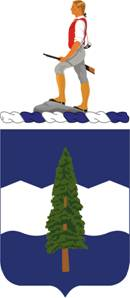
383rd Regiment
(formerly 383rd Infantry Regiment)
"Dependable"

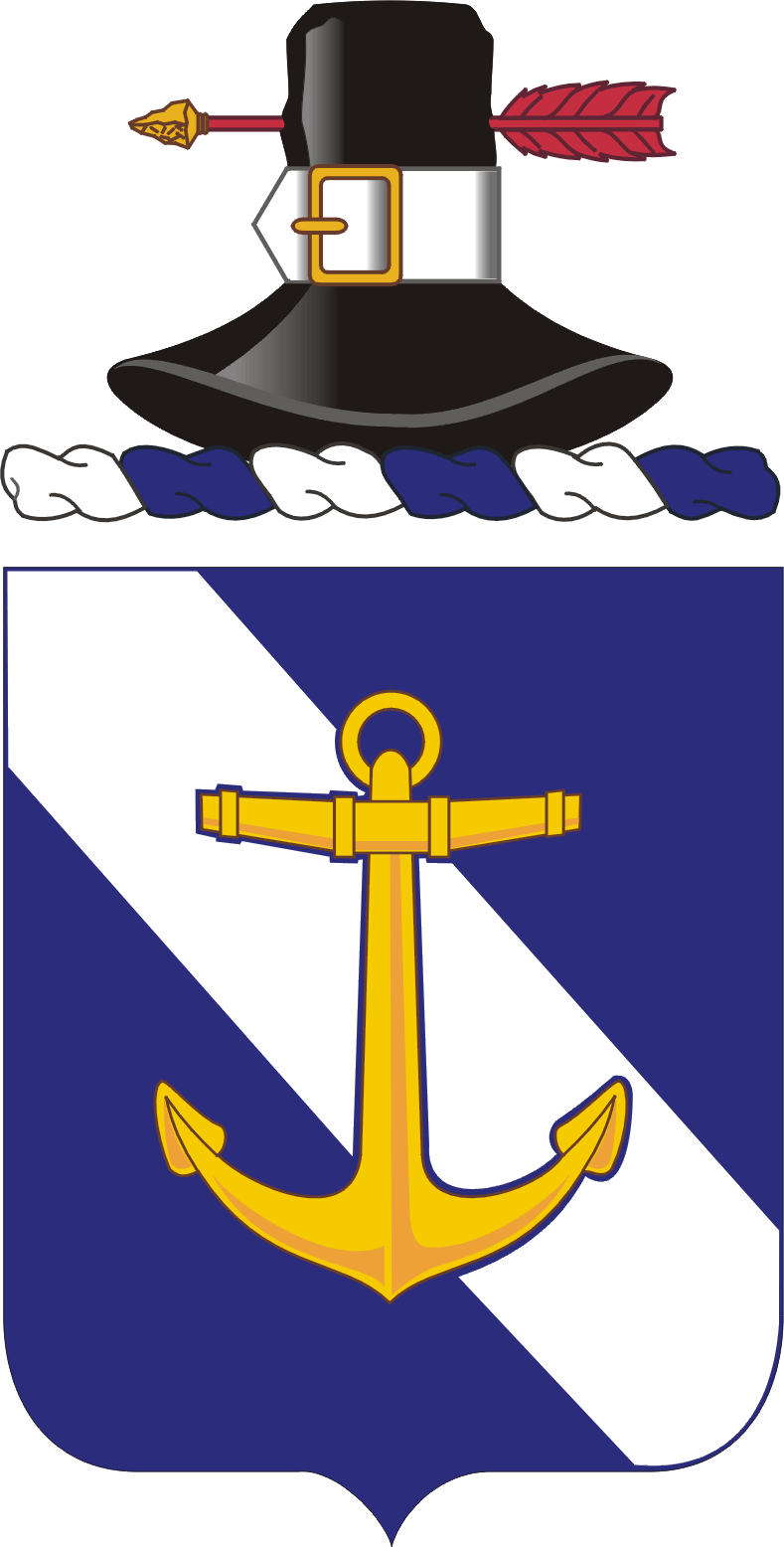
385th Regiment
(formerly 385th Infantry Regiment)
"Follow Me"

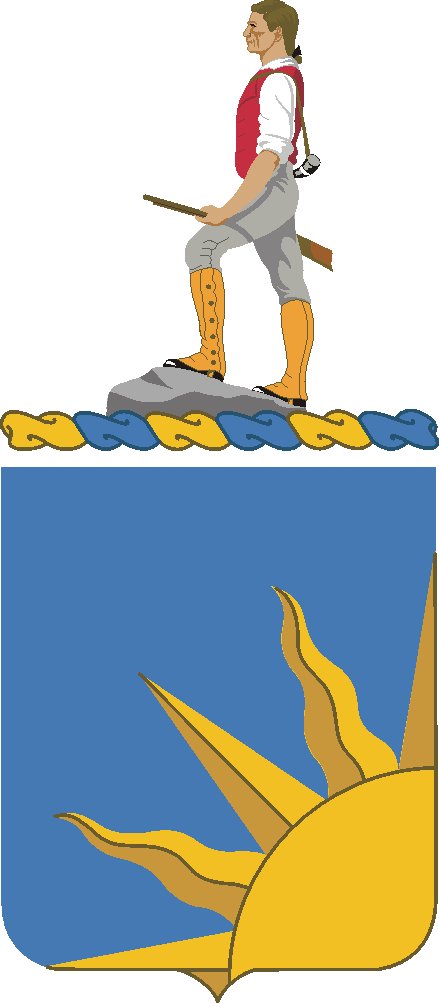
389th Regiment
(formerly 389th Infantry Regiment)
"We Will Try"

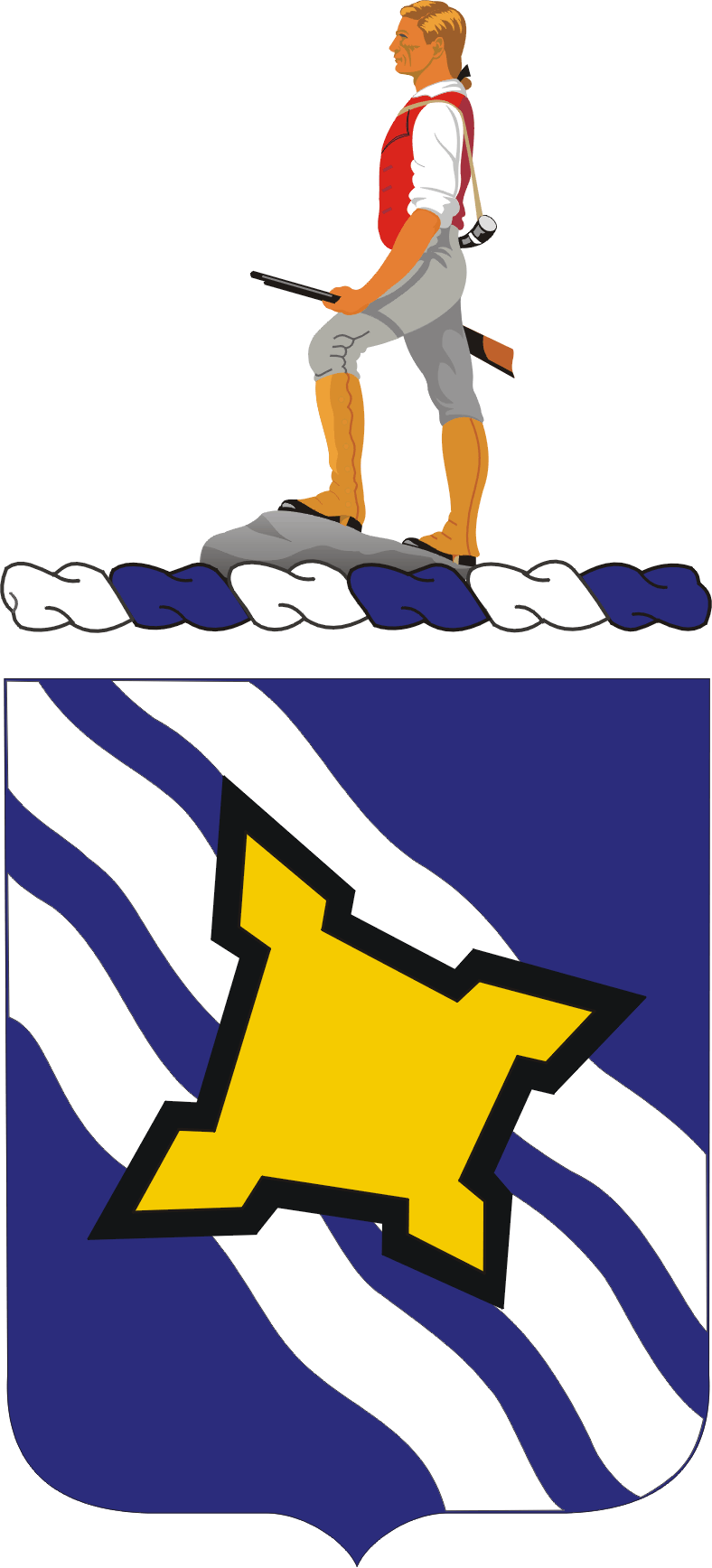
390th Regiment
(formerly 390th Infantry Regiment)
"KA-YEN-SA-HAH" (Keep The Flag Flying)

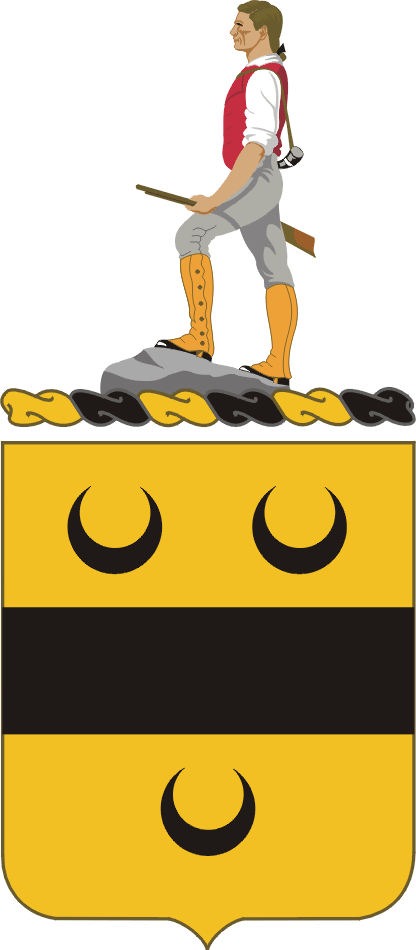
391st Regiment
(formerly 391st Infantry Regiment)
"We Will Always Win"

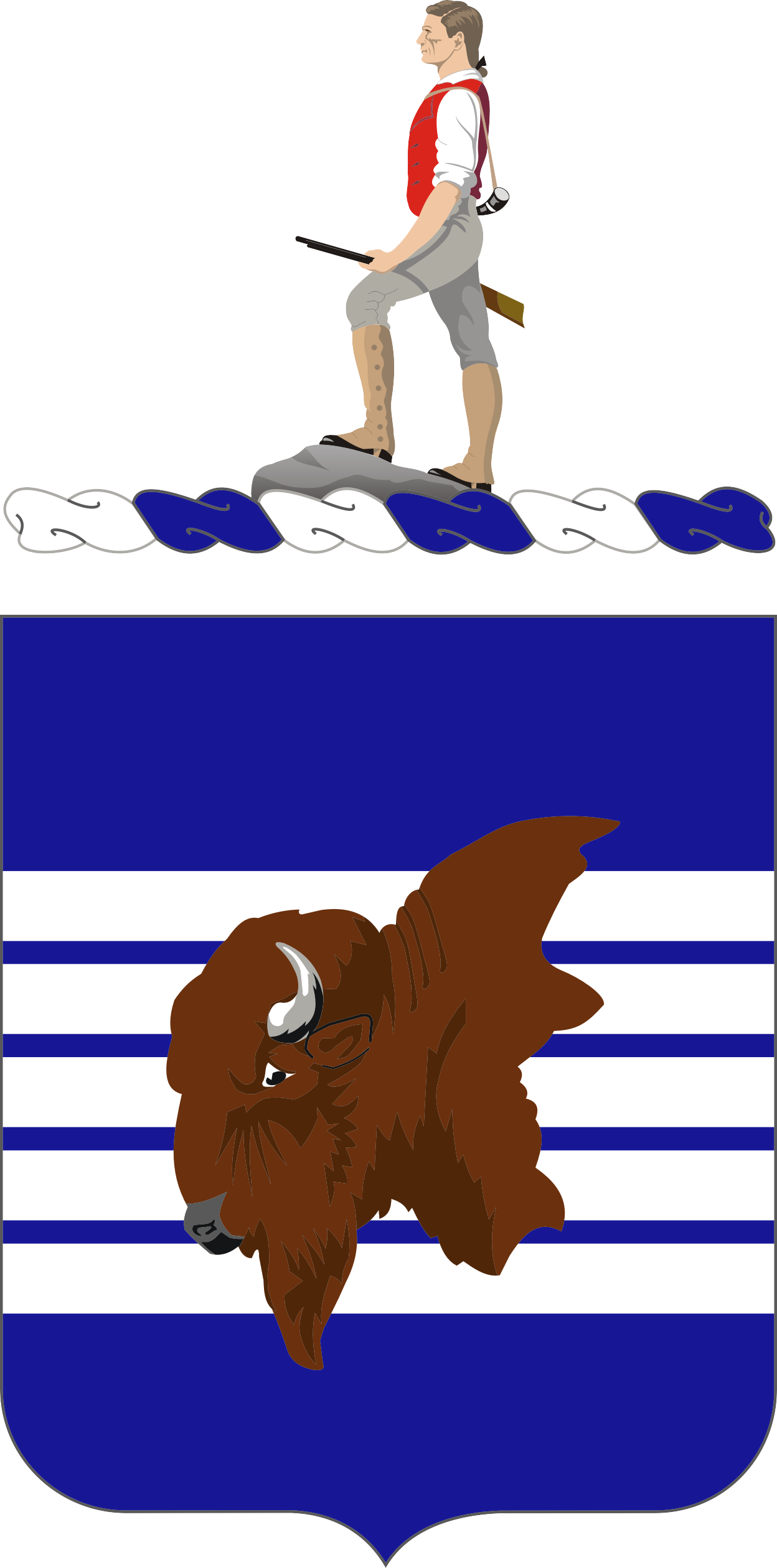
392nd Regiment
(formerly 392nd Infantry Regiment)
"Pace et bello paratus" (Prepared for Peace and War)

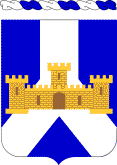
393rd Regiment
(formerly 393rd Infantry Regiment)
"Patriotic Service"

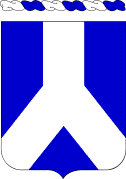
394th Regiment
(formerly 394th Infantry Regiment)
"Audax Et Cautus" (Bold and Wary)

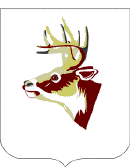
395th Regiment
(formerly 395th Infantry Regiment)
"Vigilans Et Celer" (Vigilant and Swift)

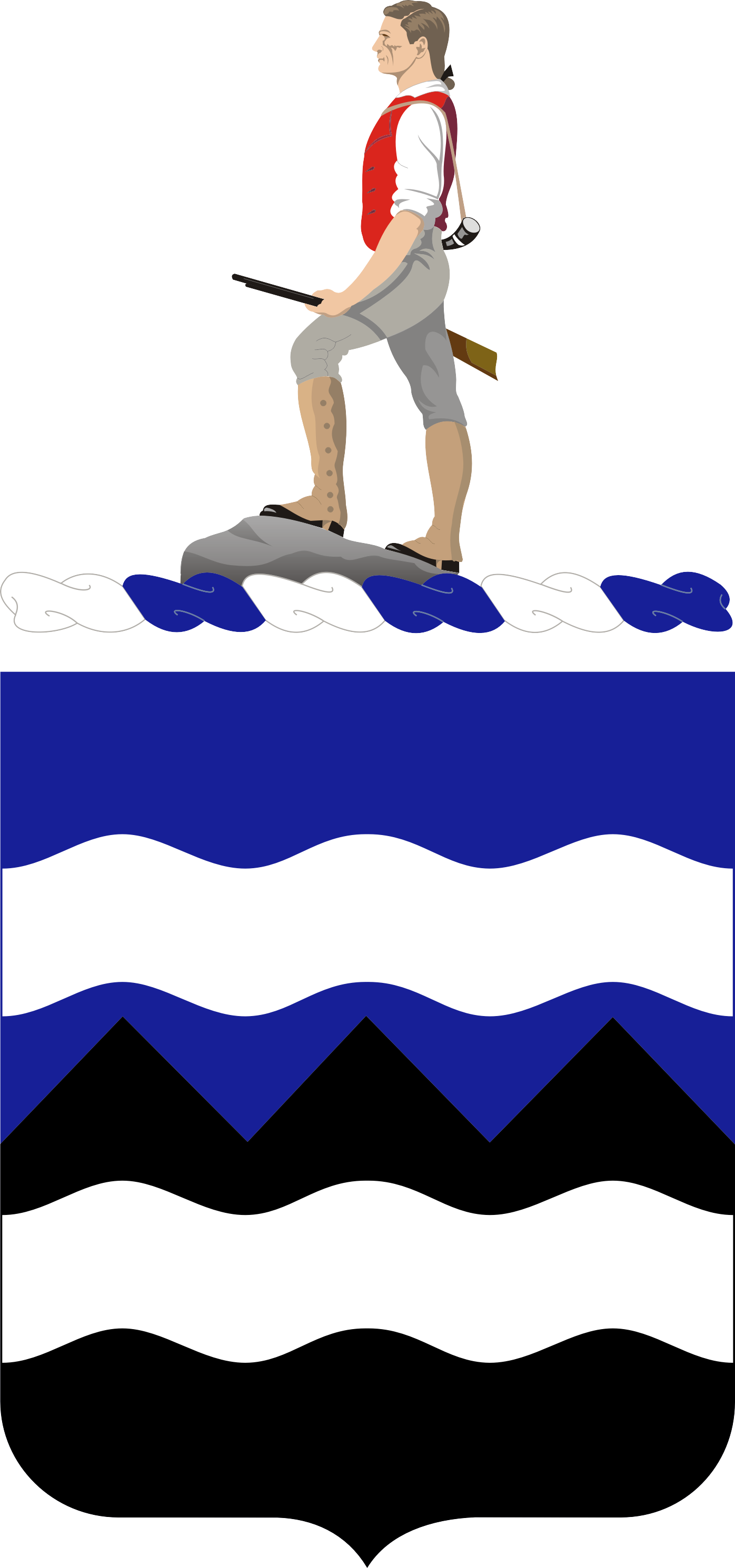
397th Regiment
(formerly 397th Infantry Regiment)
"Death before dishonor"

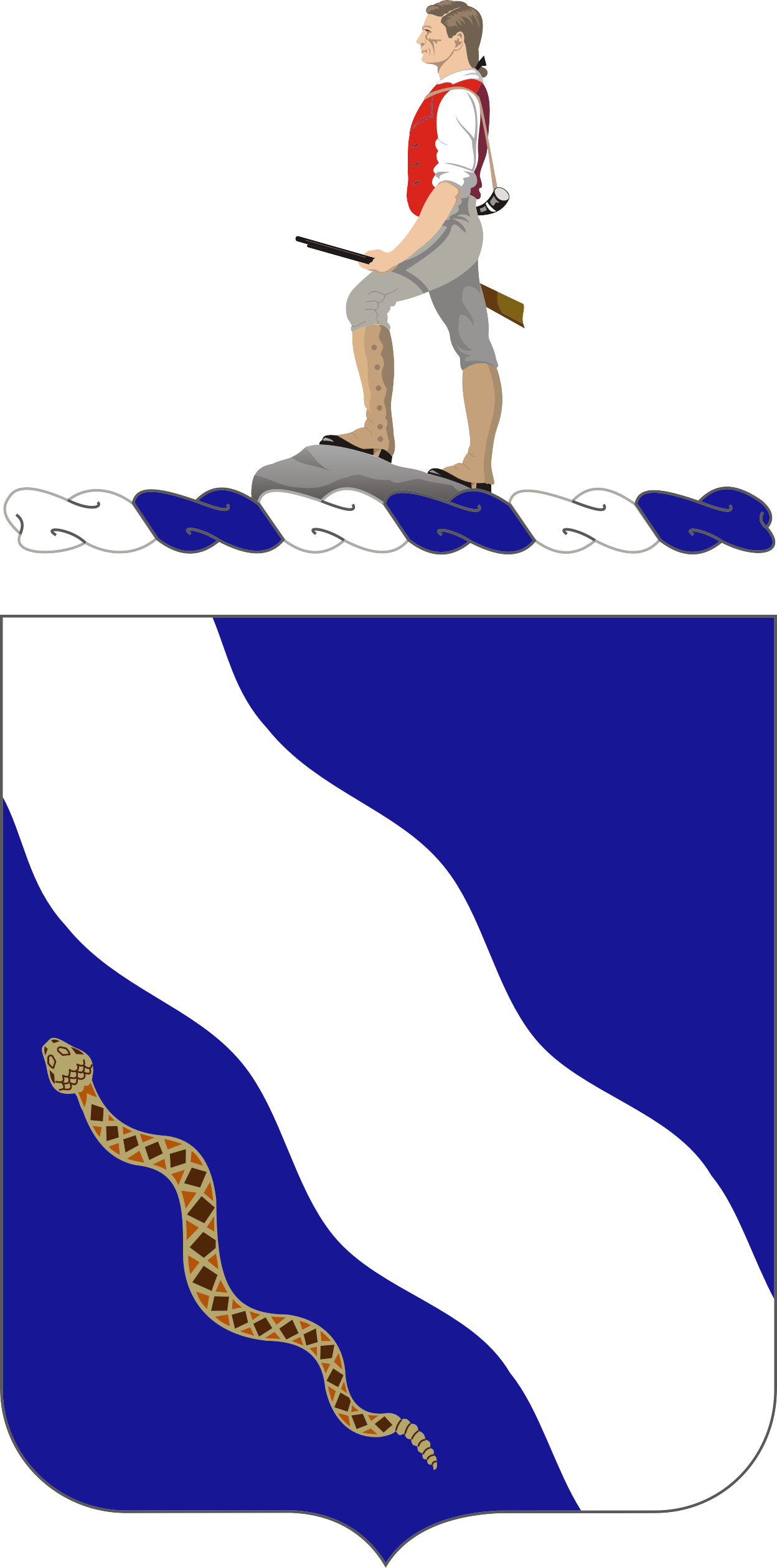
398th Regiment
(formerly 398th Infantry Regiment)
"On the alert"

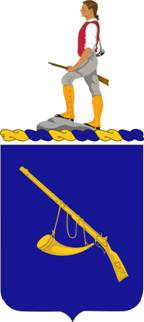
399th Regiment
(formerly 399th Infantry Regiment)
"I AM Ready"

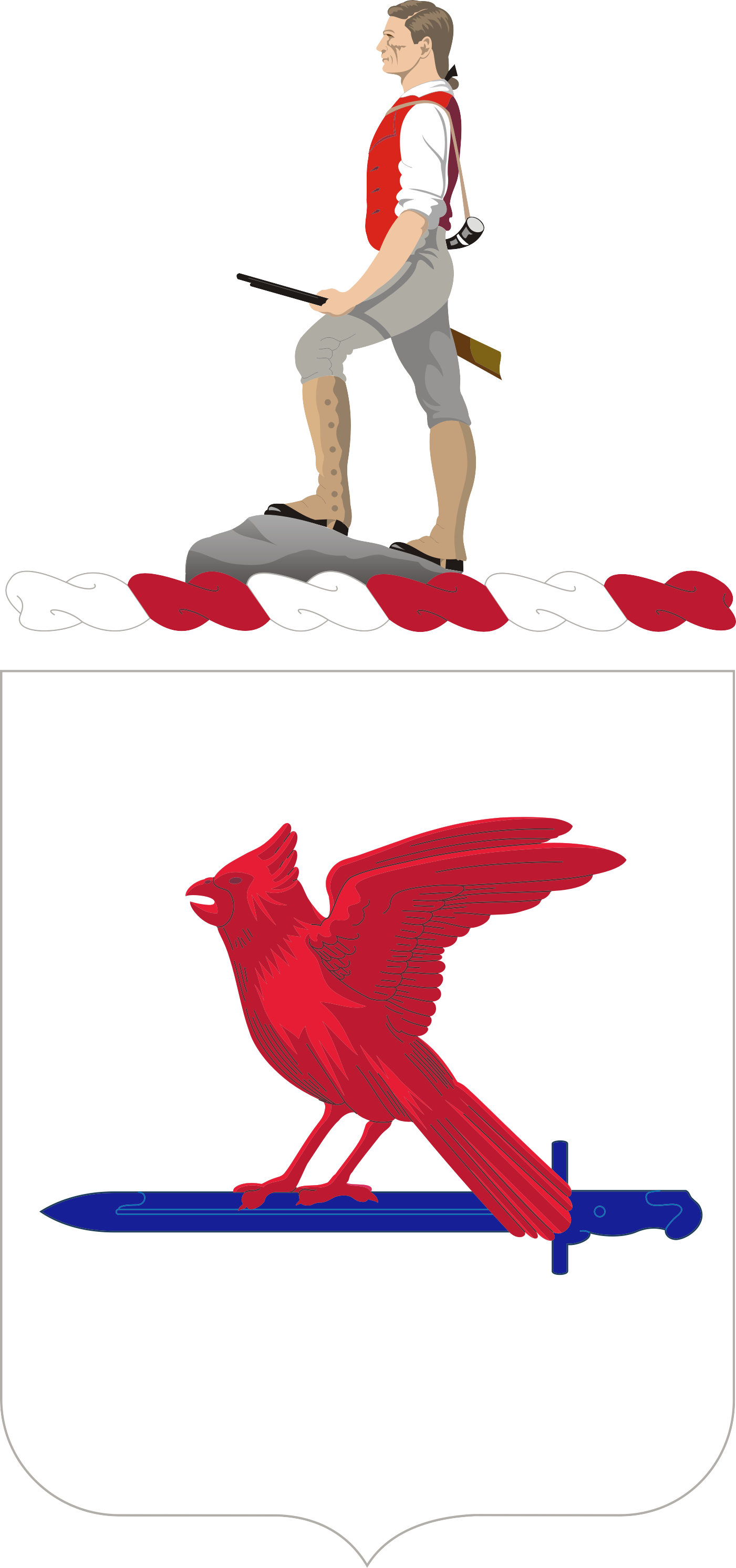
400th Regiment
(formerly 400th Infantry Regiment)
"United we stand"

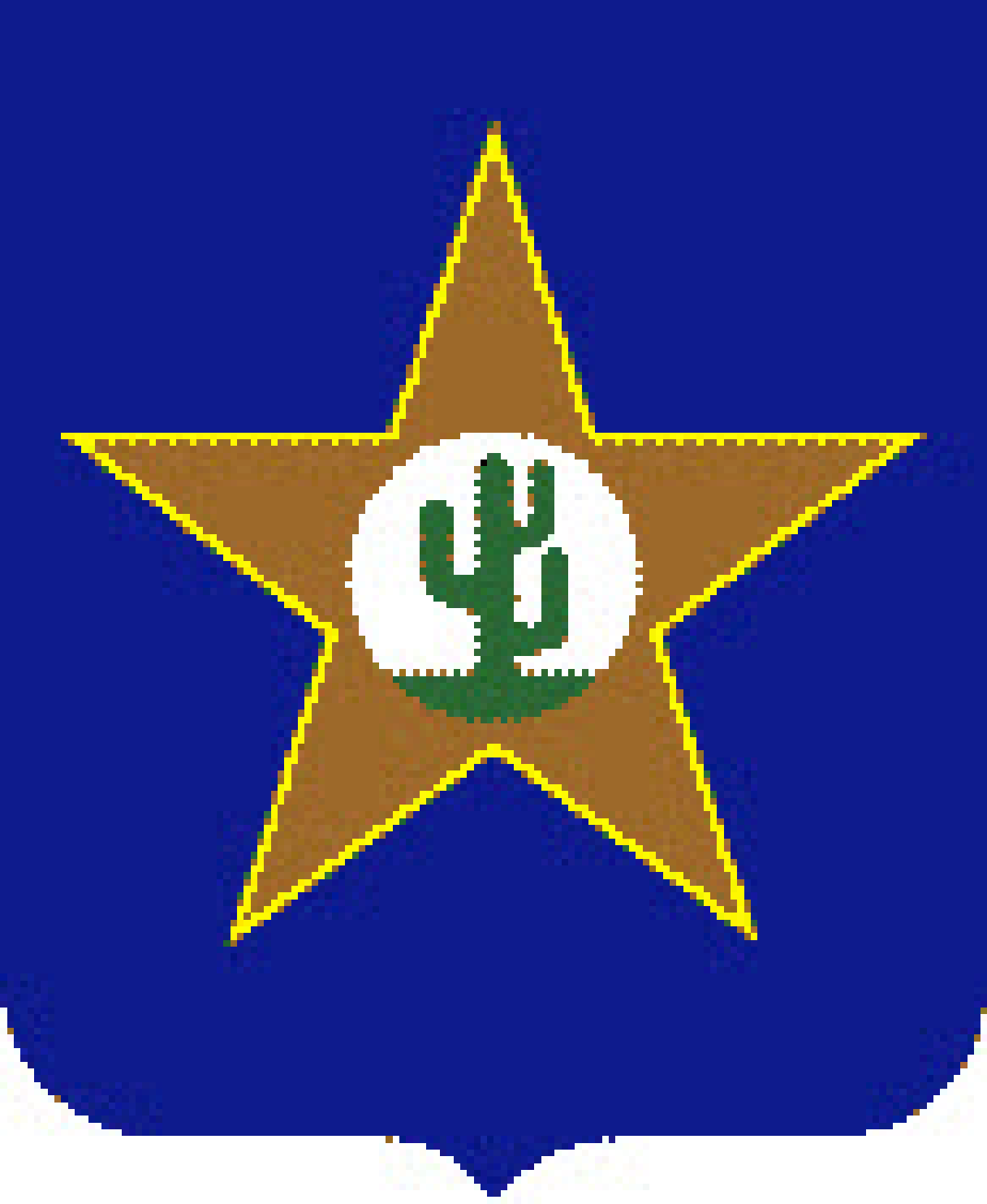
409th Regiment
(formerly 409th Infantry Regiment)
"Steadfast"

410th Regiment
(formerly 410th Infantry Regiment)
"Super Ardua Surgo" (I Rise Above Difficulties)

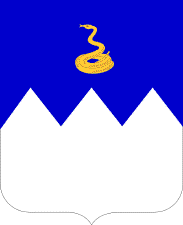
411th Regiment
(formerly 411th Infantry Regiment)
"Paratus ferier" (Ready to Strike)

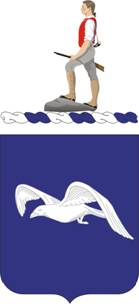
413th Regiment
(formerly 413th Infantry Regiment)
"Foritior Ex Asperis" (Stronger After Difficulties)

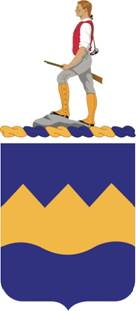
414th Regiment
"Si Vis Pacem Para Bellum" (If You Wish Peace, Prepare For War)

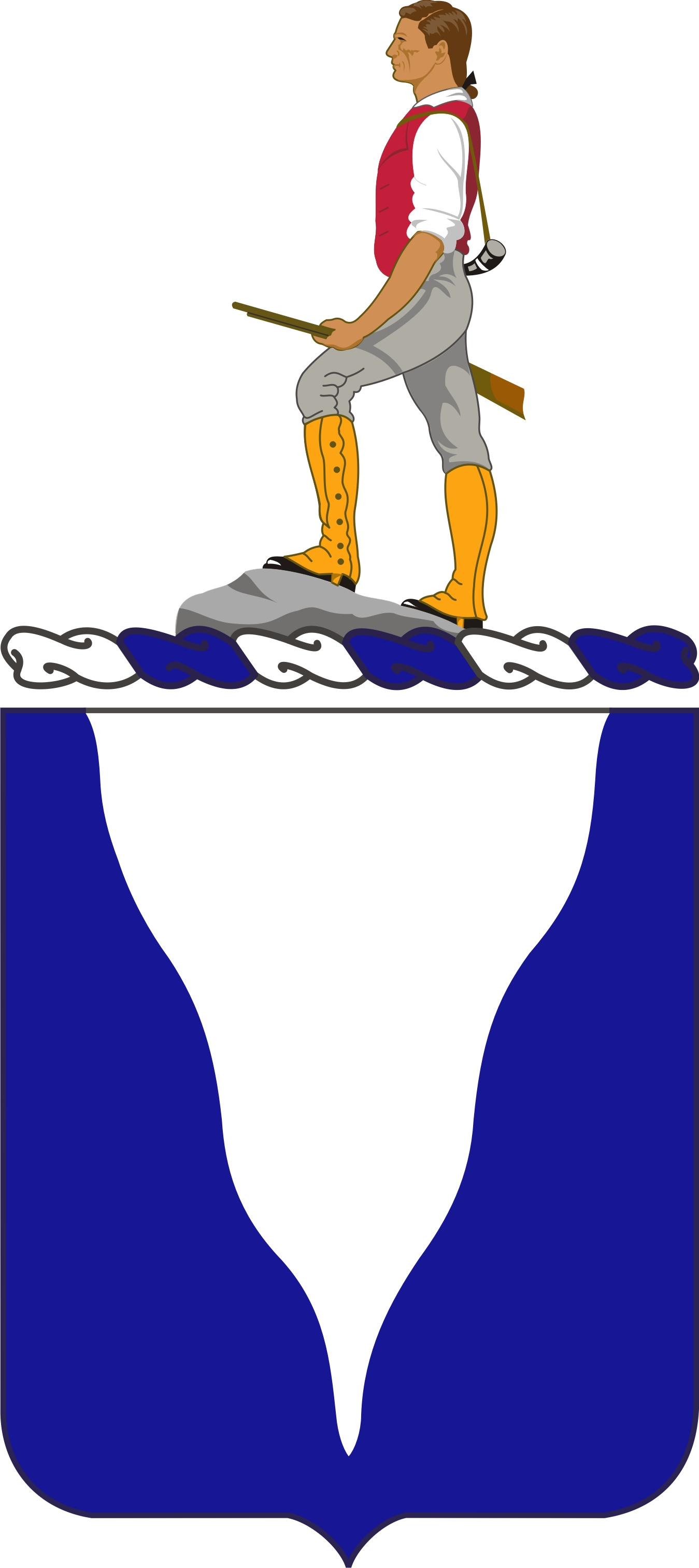
415th Regiment
(formerly 415th Infantry Regiment)
"Old faithful"

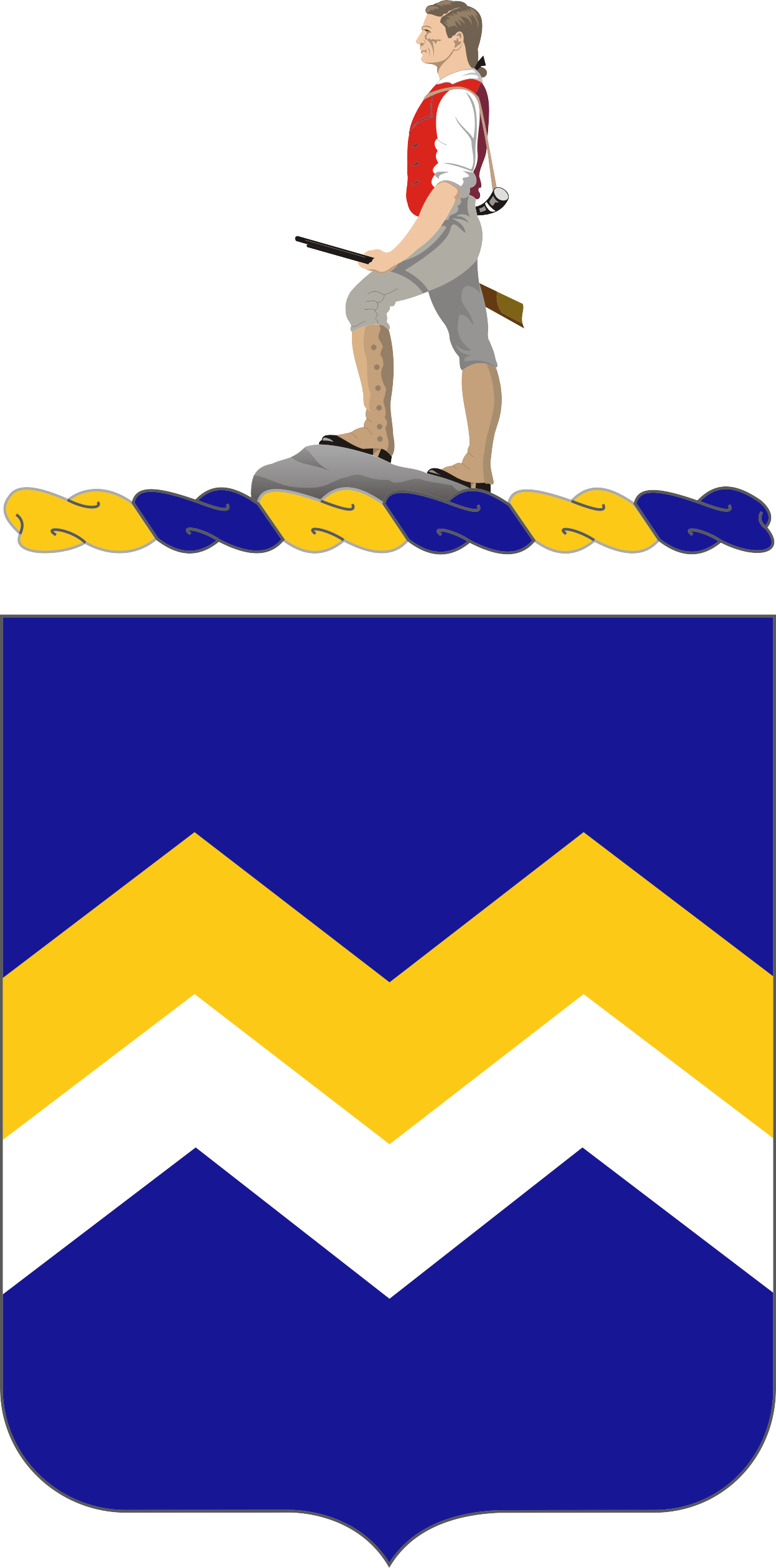
416th Regiment
(formerly 416th Infantry Regiment)
"Ne plus ultra" (Nothing Beyond or Better)

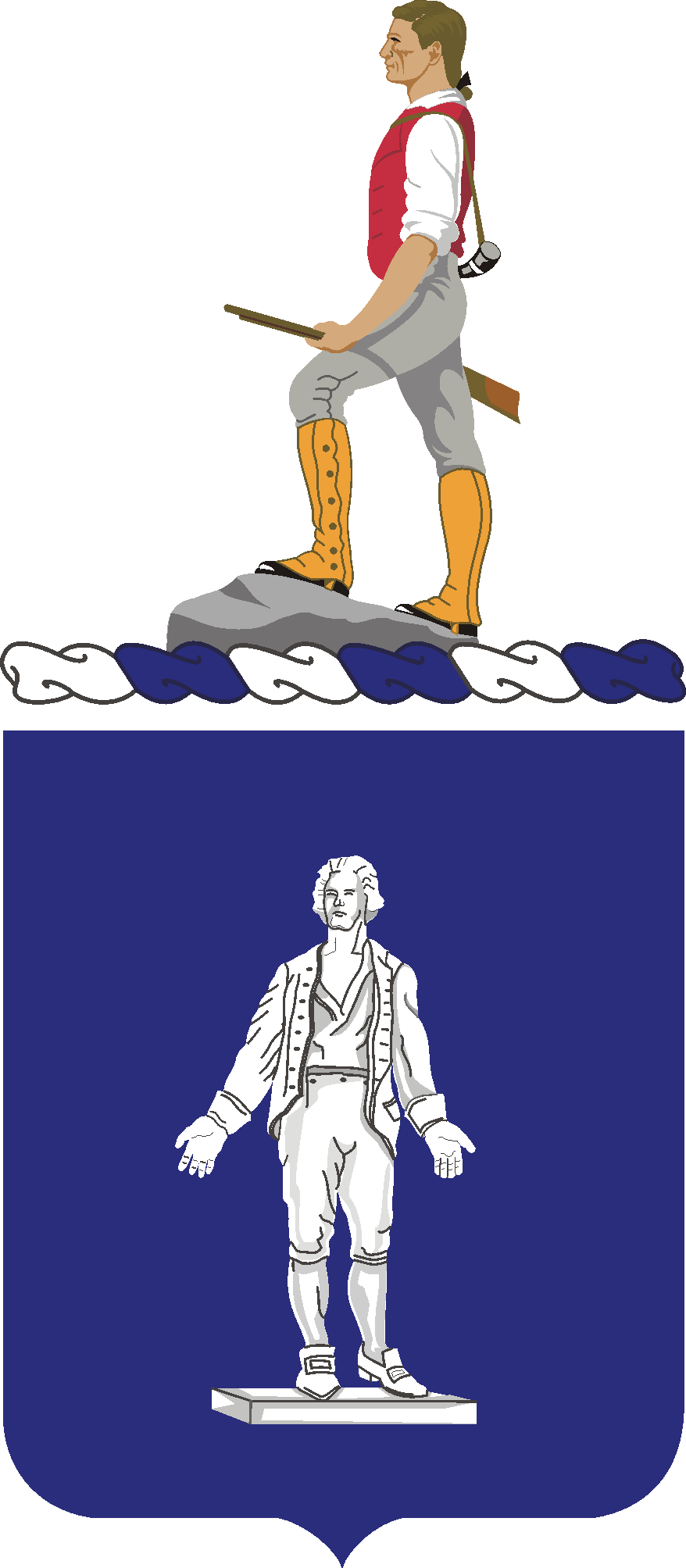
417th Regiment
(formerly 417th Infantry Regiment)
"Spirit of '76"

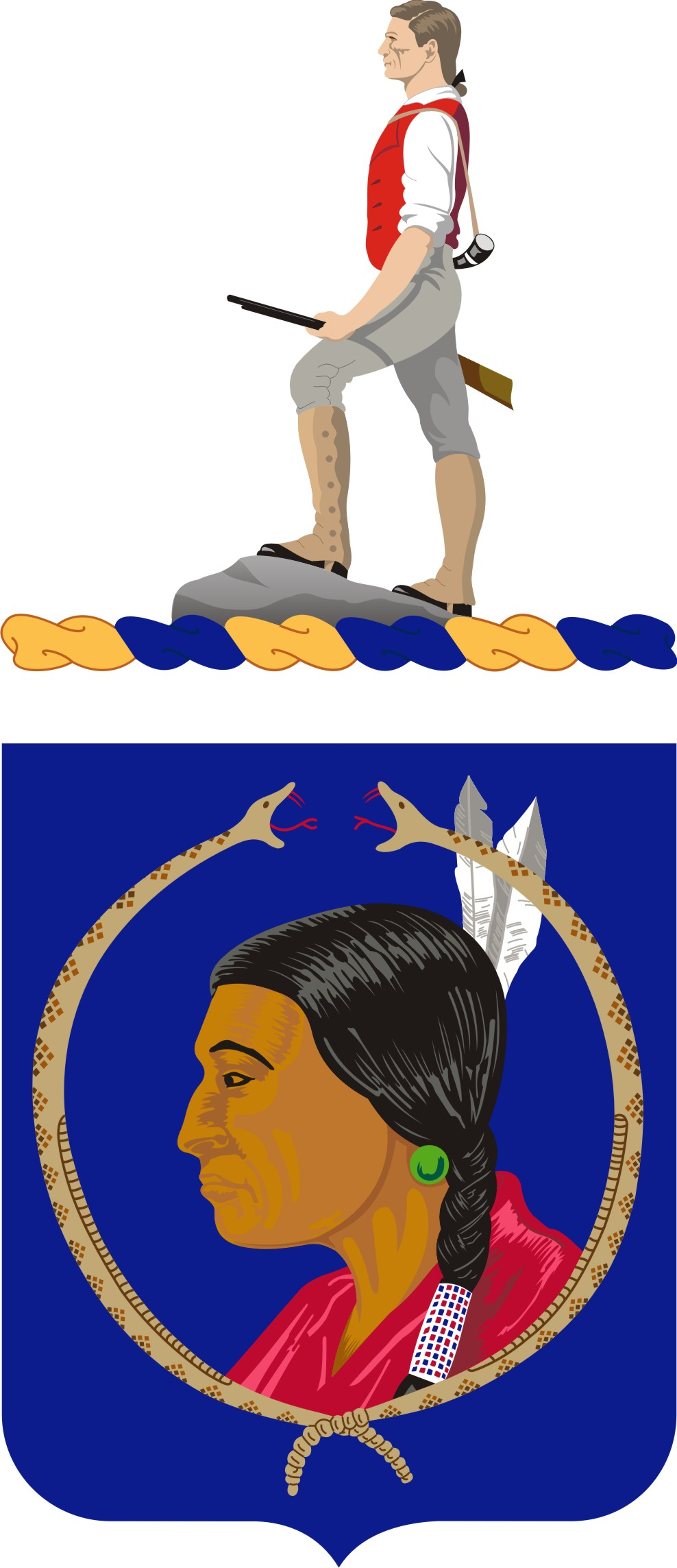
418th Regiment
(formerly 418th Infantry Regiment)
"Semper Pugnare Paratus" (Always Ready To Fight)

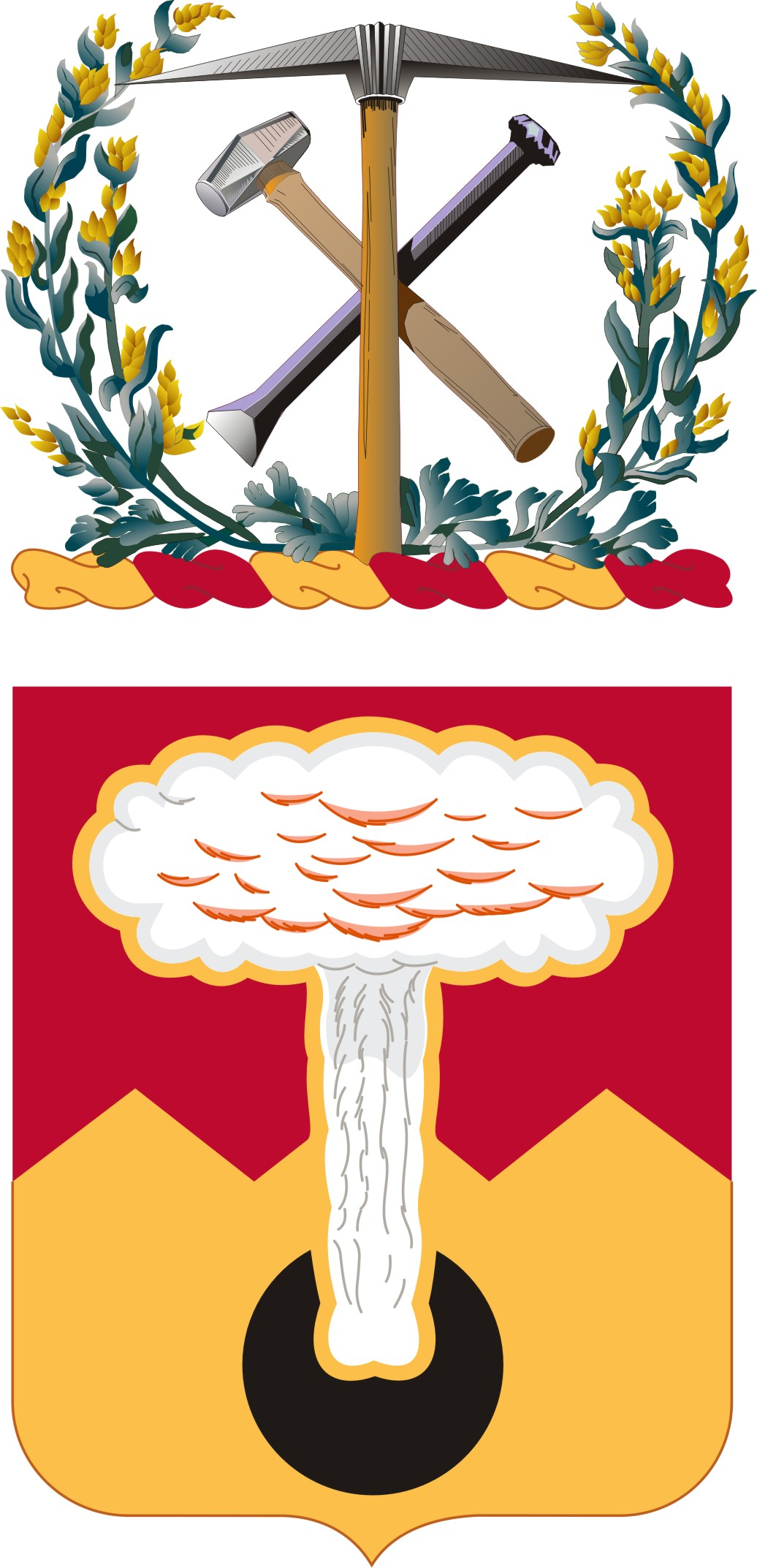
421st Regiment
(formerly 221st Field Artillery Regiment)
"Sobre Todo" (Above The Rest)

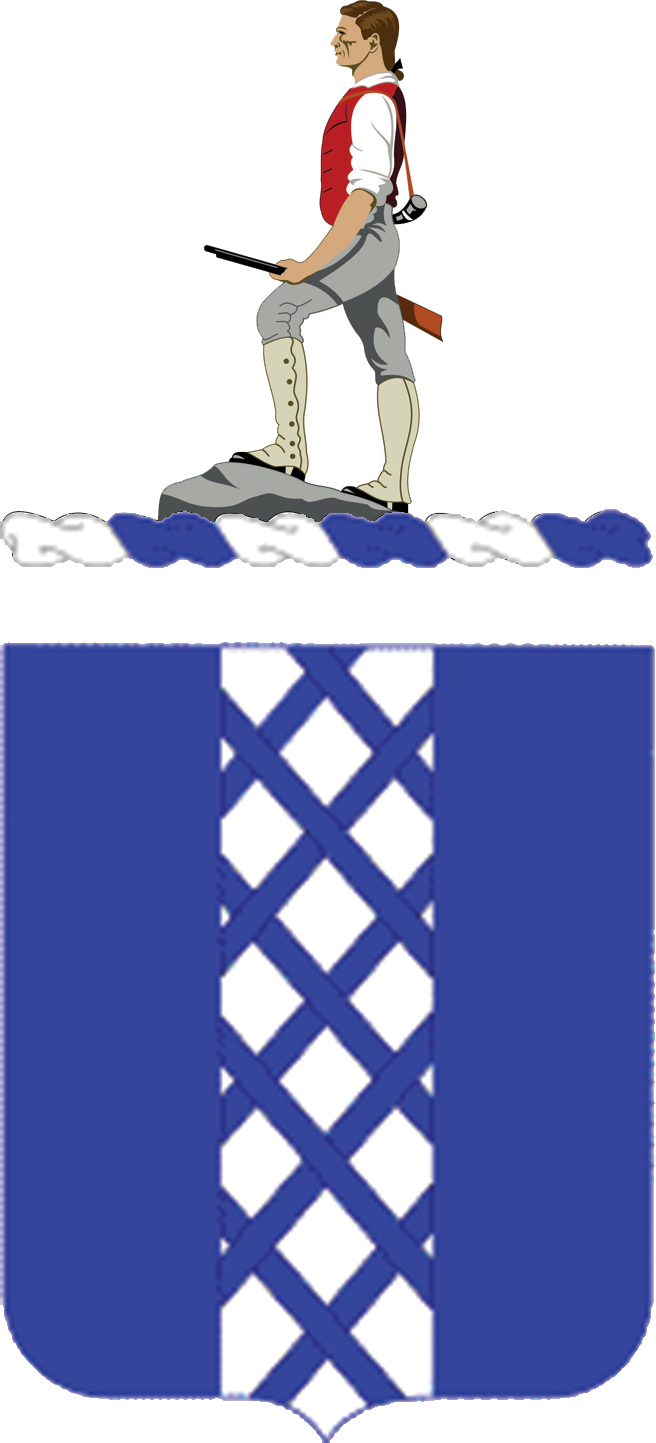
426th Regiment
(formerly 426th Infantry Regiment)
"Aeternusa Vigilantis" (Eternal Vigilance)

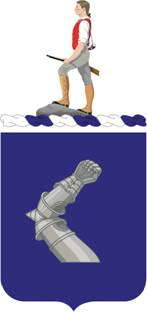
485th Regiment
(formerly 424th Infantry Regiment)
"Perrumpo" (I Break Through)

501st Infantry Regiment
"GERONIMO"

518th Regiment
(formerly 518th Infantry Regiment)
"Virtus, Fides, Honor"

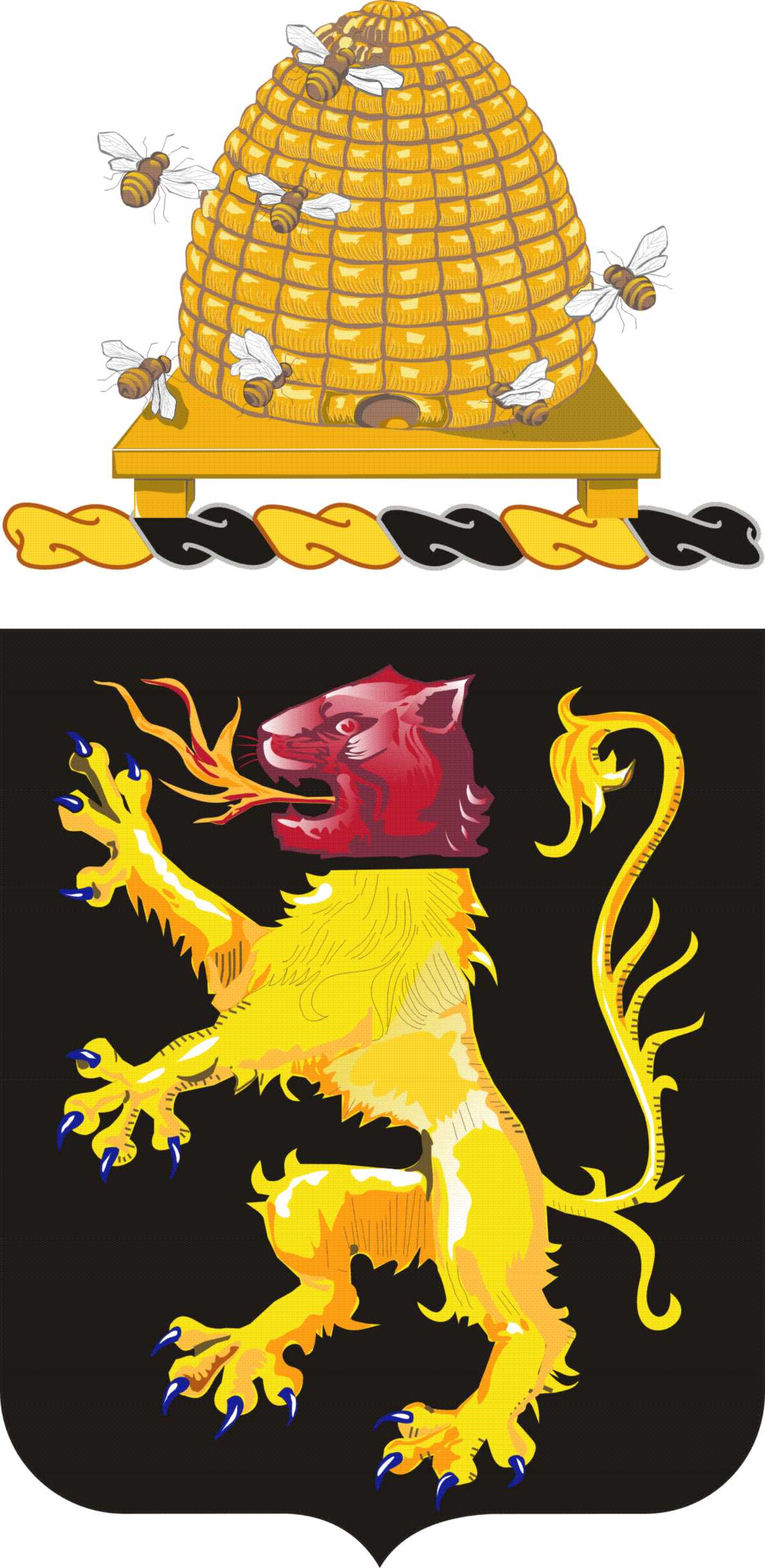
640th Regiment
(formerly 140th Field Artillery Regiment)
"Igne Et Ferris Vicimus" (We Conquered By Fire And Swords)
